

286001–286100 

|-bgcolor=#d6d6d6
| 286001 ||  || — || September 20, 2001 || Socorro || LINEAR || EOS || align=right | 2.6 km || 
|-id=002 bgcolor=#d6d6d6
| 286002 ||  || — || September 20, 2001 || Socorro || LINEAR || — || align=right | 4.6 km || 
|-id=003 bgcolor=#d6d6d6
| 286003 ||  || — || September 20, 2001 || Socorro || LINEAR || — || align=right | 3.5 km || 
|-id=004 bgcolor=#E9E9E9
| 286004 ||  || — || September 20, 2001 || Socorro || LINEAR || — || align=right | 1.5 km || 
|-id=005 bgcolor=#d6d6d6
| 286005 ||  || — || September 20, 2001 || Socorro || LINEAR || — || align=right | 2.1 km || 
|-id=006 bgcolor=#E9E9E9
| 286006 ||  || — || September 20, 2001 || Socorro || LINEAR || — || align=right | 1.7 km || 
|-id=007 bgcolor=#d6d6d6
| 286007 ||  || — || September 20, 2001 || Socorro || LINEAR || KOR || align=right | 1.6 km || 
|-id=008 bgcolor=#d6d6d6
| 286008 ||  || — || September 20, 2001 || Socorro || LINEAR || EOS || align=right | 2.2 km || 
|-id=009 bgcolor=#d6d6d6
| 286009 ||  || — || September 20, 2001 || Socorro || LINEAR || — || align=right | 3.9 km || 
|-id=010 bgcolor=#d6d6d6
| 286010 ||  || — || September 16, 2001 || Socorro || LINEAR || — || align=right | 3.8 km || 
|-id=011 bgcolor=#fefefe
| 286011 ||  || — || September 16, 2001 || Socorro || LINEAR || — || align=right | 1.0 km || 
|-id=012 bgcolor=#fefefe
| 286012 ||  || — || September 16, 2001 || Socorro || LINEAR || — || align=right | 1.1 km || 
|-id=013 bgcolor=#E9E9E9
| 286013 ||  || — || September 16, 2001 || Socorro || LINEAR || — || align=right | 1.7 km || 
|-id=014 bgcolor=#d6d6d6
| 286014 ||  || — || September 16, 2001 || Socorro || LINEAR || THM || align=right | 3.3 km || 
|-id=015 bgcolor=#d6d6d6
| 286015 ||  || — || September 16, 2001 || Socorro || LINEAR || SAN || align=right | 1.6 km || 
|-id=016 bgcolor=#d6d6d6
| 286016 ||  || — || September 16, 2001 || Socorro || LINEAR || — || align=right | 3.2 km || 
|-id=017 bgcolor=#d6d6d6
| 286017 ||  || — || September 16, 2001 || Socorro || LINEAR || — || align=right | 3.6 km || 
|-id=018 bgcolor=#d6d6d6
| 286018 ||  || — || September 16, 2001 || Socorro || LINEAR || — || align=right | 3.7 km || 
|-id=019 bgcolor=#fefefe
| 286019 ||  || — || September 16, 2001 || Socorro || LINEAR || — || align=right data-sort-value="0.71" | 710 m || 
|-id=020 bgcolor=#d6d6d6
| 286020 ||  || — || September 16, 2001 || Socorro || LINEAR || — || align=right | 4.4 km || 
|-id=021 bgcolor=#fefefe
| 286021 ||  || — || September 16, 2001 || Socorro || LINEAR || — || align=right data-sort-value="0.65" | 650 m || 
|-id=022 bgcolor=#d6d6d6
| 286022 ||  || — || September 17, 2001 || Socorro || LINEAR || — || align=right | 4.4 km || 
|-id=023 bgcolor=#fefefe
| 286023 ||  || — || September 17, 2001 || Socorro || LINEAR || — || align=right data-sort-value="0.91" | 910 m || 
|-id=024 bgcolor=#d6d6d6
| 286024 ||  || — || September 17, 2001 || Socorro || LINEAR || — || align=right | 3.6 km || 
|-id=025 bgcolor=#fefefe
| 286025 ||  || — || September 17, 2001 || Socorro || LINEAR || — || align=right | 1.2 km || 
|-id=026 bgcolor=#fefefe
| 286026 ||  || — || September 17, 2001 || Socorro || LINEAR || FLO || align=right data-sort-value="0.75" | 750 m || 
|-id=027 bgcolor=#fefefe
| 286027 ||  || — || September 17, 2001 || Socorro || LINEAR || — || align=right data-sort-value="0.90" | 900 m || 
|-id=028 bgcolor=#fefefe
| 286028 ||  || — || September 17, 2001 || Socorro || LINEAR || V || align=right data-sort-value="0.98" | 980 m || 
|-id=029 bgcolor=#fefefe
| 286029 ||  || — || September 19, 2001 || Socorro || LINEAR || — || align=right data-sort-value="0.80" | 800 m || 
|-id=030 bgcolor=#d6d6d6
| 286030 ||  || — || September 19, 2001 || Socorro || LINEAR || TIR || align=right | 4.4 km || 
|-id=031 bgcolor=#E9E9E9
| 286031 ||  || — || September 16, 2001 || Socorro || LINEAR || — || align=right | 2.4 km || 
|-id=032 bgcolor=#E9E9E9
| 286032 ||  || — || September 16, 2001 || Socorro || LINEAR || — || align=right | 1.2 km || 
|-id=033 bgcolor=#fefefe
| 286033 ||  || — || September 16, 2001 || Socorro || LINEAR || — || align=right data-sort-value="0.93" | 930 m || 
|-id=034 bgcolor=#E9E9E9
| 286034 ||  || — || September 19, 2001 || Socorro || LINEAR || — || align=right | 2.3 km || 
|-id=035 bgcolor=#d6d6d6
| 286035 ||  || — || September 19, 2001 || Socorro || LINEAR || — || align=right | 4.1 km || 
|-id=036 bgcolor=#d6d6d6
| 286036 ||  || — || September 19, 2001 || Socorro || LINEAR || — || align=right | 3.5 km || 
|-id=037 bgcolor=#E9E9E9
| 286037 ||  || — || September 19, 2001 || Socorro || LINEAR || — || align=right | 1.7 km || 
|-id=038 bgcolor=#d6d6d6
| 286038 ||  || — || September 19, 2001 || Socorro || LINEAR || KOR || align=right | 2.3 km || 
|-id=039 bgcolor=#E9E9E9
| 286039 ||  || — || September 19, 2001 || Socorro || LINEAR || HOF || align=right | 3.6 km || 
|-id=040 bgcolor=#fefefe
| 286040 ||  || — || September 19, 2001 || Socorro || LINEAR || FLO || align=right data-sort-value="0.89" | 890 m || 
|-id=041 bgcolor=#E9E9E9
| 286041 ||  || — || September 19, 2001 || Socorro || LINEAR || — || align=right | 1.5 km || 
|-id=042 bgcolor=#d6d6d6
| 286042 ||  || — || September 19, 2001 || Socorro || LINEAR || CHA || align=right | 2.4 km || 
|-id=043 bgcolor=#d6d6d6
| 286043 ||  || — || September 19, 2001 || Socorro || LINEAR || — || align=right | 2.0 km || 
|-id=044 bgcolor=#E9E9E9
| 286044 ||  || — || September 19, 2001 || Socorro || LINEAR || — || align=right | 2.9 km || 
|-id=045 bgcolor=#d6d6d6
| 286045 ||  || — || September 19, 2001 || Socorro || LINEAR || MEL || align=right | 3.7 km || 
|-id=046 bgcolor=#d6d6d6
| 286046 ||  || — || September 19, 2001 || Socorro || LINEAR || THM || align=right | 2.5 km || 
|-id=047 bgcolor=#E9E9E9
| 286047 ||  || — || September 19, 2001 || Socorro || LINEAR || — || align=right | 1.5 km || 
|-id=048 bgcolor=#fefefe
| 286048 ||  || — || September 19, 2001 || Socorro || LINEAR || — || align=right data-sort-value="0.87" | 870 m || 
|-id=049 bgcolor=#d6d6d6
| 286049 ||  || — || September 19, 2001 || Socorro || LINEAR || — || align=right | 3.2 km || 
|-id=050 bgcolor=#E9E9E9
| 286050 ||  || — || September 19, 2001 || Socorro || LINEAR || — || align=right | 2.3 km || 
|-id=051 bgcolor=#d6d6d6
| 286051 ||  || — || September 19, 2001 || Socorro || LINEAR || — || align=right | 2.9 km || 
|-id=052 bgcolor=#fefefe
| 286052 ||  || — || September 19, 2001 || Socorro || LINEAR || V || align=right data-sort-value="0.70" | 700 m || 
|-id=053 bgcolor=#E9E9E9
| 286053 ||  || — || September 19, 2001 || Socorro || LINEAR || — || align=right | 1.9 km || 
|-id=054 bgcolor=#fefefe
| 286054 ||  || — || September 19, 2001 || Socorro || LINEAR || ERI || align=right | 2.1 km || 
|-id=055 bgcolor=#E9E9E9
| 286055 ||  || — || September 20, 2001 || Kitt Peak || Spacewatch || — || align=right | 2.9 km || 
|-id=056 bgcolor=#fefefe
| 286056 ||  || — || September 28, 2001 || Eskridge || G. Hug || FLO || align=right data-sort-value="0.59" | 590 m || 
|-id=057 bgcolor=#d6d6d6
| 286057 ||  || — || September 22, 2001 || Kitt Peak || Spacewatch || TIR || align=right | 3.8 km || 
|-id=058 bgcolor=#E9E9E9
| 286058 ||  || — || September 27, 2001 || Palomar || NEAT || — || align=right | 2.1 km || 
|-id=059 bgcolor=#E9E9E9
| 286059 ||  || — || September 16, 2001 || Socorro || LINEAR || — || align=right | 3.1 km || 
|-id=060 bgcolor=#d6d6d6
| 286060 ||  || — || September 20, 2001 || Socorro || LINEAR || — || align=right | 4.4 km || 
|-id=061 bgcolor=#d6d6d6
| 286061 ||  || — || September 20, 2001 || Socorro || LINEAR || — || align=right | 3.5 km || 
|-id=062 bgcolor=#E9E9E9
| 286062 ||  || — || September 20, 2001 || Socorro || LINEAR || — || align=right | 3.5 km || 
|-id=063 bgcolor=#E9E9E9
| 286063 ||  || — || September 20, 2001 || Socorro || LINEAR || — || align=right | 2.3 km || 
|-id=064 bgcolor=#fefefe
| 286064 ||  || — || September 22, 2001 || Socorro || LINEAR || V || align=right data-sort-value="0.83" | 830 m || 
|-id=065 bgcolor=#fefefe
| 286065 ||  || — || September 22, 2001 || Socorro || LINEAR || — || align=right data-sort-value="0.87" | 870 m || 
|-id=066 bgcolor=#d6d6d6
| 286066 ||  || — || September 20, 2001 || Socorro || LINEAR || — || align=right | 3.2 km || 
|-id=067 bgcolor=#E9E9E9
| 286067 ||  || — || September 16, 2001 || Socorro || LINEAR || — || align=right | 1.9 km || 
|-id=068 bgcolor=#fefefe
| 286068 ||  || — || September 25, 2001 || Socorro || LINEAR || — || align=right data-sort-value="0.97" | 970 m || 
|-id=069 bgcolor=#d6d6d6
| 286069 ||  || — || September 21, 2001 || Socorro || LINEAR || — || align=right | 3.4 km || 
|-id=070 bgcolor=#E9E9E9
| 286070 ||  || — || September 18, 2001 || Kitt Peak || Spacewatch || — || align=right | 2.6 km || 
|-id=071 bgcolor=#E9E9E9
| 286071 ||  || — || September 20, 2001 || Kitt Peak || Spacewatch || — || align=right | 1.6 km || 
|-id=072 bgcolor=#fefefe
| 286072 ||  || — || September 23, 2001 || Anderson Mesa || LONEOS || PHO || align=right | 1.1 km || 
|-id=073 bgcolor=#d6d6d6
| 286073 ||  || — || September 18, 2001 || Kitt Peak || Spacewatch || — || align=right | 3.5 km || 
|-id=074 bgcolor=#fefefe
| 286074 ||  || — || September 20, 2001 || Socorro || LINEAR || — || align=right data-sort-value="0.91" | 910 m || 
|-id=075 bgcolor=#d6d6d6
| 286075 ||  || — || September 26, 2001 || Desert Eagle || W. K. Y. Yeung || — || align=right | 3.7 km || 
|-id=076 bgcolor=#fefefe
| 286076 ||  || — || September 24, 2001 || Palomar || NEAT || NYS || align=right data-sort-value="0.73" | 730 m || 
|-id=077 bgcolor=#fefefe
| 286077 ||  || — || March 16, 2007 || Kitt Peak || Spacewatch || FLO || align=right data-sort-value="0.70" | 700 m || 
|-id=078 bgcolor=#d6d6d6
| 286078 ||  || — || September 14, 2006 || Catalina || CSS || — || align=right | 3.5 km || 
|-id=079 bgcolor=#FFC2E0
| 286079 ||  || — || October 9, 2001 || Socorro || LINEAR || ATE || align=right data-sort-value="0.52" | 520 m || 
|-id=080 bgcolor=#FFC2E0
| 286080 ||  || — || October 10, 2001 || Palomar || NEAT || APOPHA || align=right data-sort-value="0.21" | 210 m || 
|-id=081 bgcolor=#d6d6d6
| 286081 ||  || — || October 13, 2001 || Socorro || LINEAR || — || align=right | 5.2 km || 
|-id=082 bgcolor=#fefefe
| 286082 ||  || — || October 13, 2001 || Socorro || LINEAR || — || align=right data-sort-value="0.79" | 790 m || 
|-id=083 bgcolor=#E9E9E9
| 286083 ||  || — || October 14, 2001 || Ondřejov || P. Pravec, P. Kušnirák || RAF || align=right | 1.1 km || 
|-id=084 bgcolor=#d6d6d6
| 286084 ||  || — || October 14, 2001 || Desert Eagle || W. K. Y. Yeung || THB || align=right | 4.2 km || 
|-id=085 bgcolor=#fefefe
| 286085 ||  || — || October 14, 2001 || Desert Eagle || W. K. Y. Yeung || NYS || align=right data-sort-value="0.96" | 960 m || 
|-id=086 bgcolor=#d6d6d6
| 286086 ||  || — || October 9, 2001 || Socorro || LINEAR || — || align=right | 4.0 km || 
|-id=087 bgcolor=#d6d6d6
| 286087 ||  || — || October 13, 2001 || Socorro || LINEAR || — || align=right | 6.9 km || 
|-id=088 bgcolor=#fefefe
| 286088 ||  || — || October 14, 2001 || Socorro || LINEAR || — || align=right data-sort-value="0.98" | 980 m || 
|-id=089 bgcolor=#d6d6d6
| 286089 ||  || — || October 14, 2001 || Socorro || LINEAR || — || align=right | 4.4 km || 
|-id=090 bgcolor=#fefefe
| 286090 ||  || — || October 14, 2001 || Socorro || LINEAR || FLO || align=right data-sort-value="0.90" | 900 m || 
|-id=091 bgcolor=#fefefe
| 286091 ||  || — || October 14, 2001 || Socorro || LINEAR || — || align=right data-sort-value="0.87" | 870 m || 
|-id=092 bgcolor=#fefefe
| 286092 ||  || — || October 14, 2001 || Socorro || LINEAR || — || align=right | 1.1 km || 
|-id=093 bgcolor=#fefefe
| 286093 ||  || — || October 14, 2001 || Socorro || LINEAR || H || align=right | 1.0 km || 
|-id=094 bgcolor=#d6d6d6
| 286094 ||  || — || October 14, 2001 || Socorro || LINEAR || — || align=right | 6.5 km || 
|-id=095 bgcolor=#fefefe
| 286095 ||  || — || October 15, 2001 || Socorro || LINEAR || H || align=right data-sort-value="0.96" | 960 m || 
|-id=096 bgcolor=#d6d6d6
| 286096 ||  || — || October 14, 2001 || Cima Ekar || ADAS || EOS || align=right | 2.3 km || 
|-id=097 bgcolor=#fefefe
| 286097 ||  || — || October 13, 2001 || Socorro || LINEAR || — || align=right data-sort-value="0.93" | 930 m || 
|-id=098 bgcolor=#E9E9E9
| 286098 ||  || — || October 13, 2001 || Socorro || LINEAR || — || align=right | 3.3 km || 
|-id=099 bgcolor=#d6d6d6
| 286099 ||  || — || October 13, 2001 || Socorro || LINEAR || — || align=right | 3.4 km || 
|-id=100 bgcolor=#E9E9E9
| 286100 ||  || — || October 13, 2001 || Socorro || LINEAR || — || align=right | 2.8 km || 
|}

286101–286200 

|-bgcolor=#FA8072
| 286101 ||  || — || October 13, 2001 || Socorro || LINEAR || — || align=right data-sort-value="0.80" | 800 m || 
|-id=102 bgcolor=#E9E9E9
| 286102 ||  || — || October 14, 2001 || Socorro || LINEAR || AGN || align=right | 1.6 km || 
|-id=103 bgcolor=#fefefe
| 286103 ||  || — || October 14, 2001 || Socorro || LINEAR || — || align=right | 1.3 km || 
|-id=104 bgcolor=#fefefe
| 286104 ||  || — || October 14, 2001 || Socorro || LINEAR || FLO || align=right data-sort-value="0.65" | 650 m || 
|-id=105 bgcolor=#fefefe
| 286105 ||  || — || October 14, 2001 || Socorro || LINEAR || — || align=right data-sort-value="0.94" | 940 m || 
|-id=106 bgcolor=#C2FFFF
| 286106 ||  || — || October 14, 2001 || Socorro || LINEAR || L5 || align=right | 16 km || 
|-id=107 bgcolor=#d6d6d6
| 286107 ||  || — || October 14, 2001 || Socorro || LINEAR || — || align=right | 4.2 km || 
|-id=108 bgcolor=#fefefe
| 286108 ||  || — || October 14, 2001 || Socorro || LINEAR || — || align=right | 1.1 km || 
|-id=109 bgcolor=#fefefe
| 286109 ||  || — || October 14, 2001 || Socorro || LINEAR || FLO || align=right data-sort-value="0.67" | 670 m || 
|-id=110 bgcolor=#C2FFFF
| 286110 ||  || — || October 14, 2001 || Socorro || LINEAR || L5 || align=right | 13 km || 
|-id=111 bgcolor=#d6d6d6
| 286111 ||  || — || October 15, 2001 || Socorro || LINEAR || EOS || align=right | 2.1 km || 
|-id=112 bgcolor=#E9E9E9
| 286112 ||  || — || October 15, 2001 || Socorro || LINEAR || — || align=right | 2.5 km || 
|-id=113 bgcolor=#d6d6d6
| 286113 ||  || — || October 15, 2001 || Socorro || LINEAR || — || align=right | 3.4 km || 
|-id=114 bgcolor=#C2FFFF
| 286114 ||  || — || October 15, 2001 || Socorro || LINEAR || L5 || align=right | 17 km || 
|-id=115 bgcolor=#fefefe
| 286115 ||  || — || October 12, 2001 || Haleakala || NEAT || — || align=right | 1.1 km || 
|-id=116 bgcolor=#d6d6d6
| 286116 ||  || — || October 13, 2001 || Kitt Peak || Spacewatch || — || align=right | 2.6 km || 
|-id=117 bgcolor=#d6d6d6
| 286117 ||  || — || October 15, 2001 || Kitt Peak || Spacewatch || KOR || align=right | 1.7 km || 
|-id=118 bgcolor=#E9E9E9
| 286118 ||  || — || October 11, 2001 || Palomar || NEAT || — || align=right | 1.2 km || 
|-id=119 bgcolor=#E9E9E9
| 286119 ||  || — || October 10, 2001 || Palomar || NEAT || — || align=right | 2.1 km || 
|-id=120 bgcolor=#d6d6d6
| 286120 ||  || — || October 10, 2001 || Palomar || NEAT || HYG || align=right | 3.8 km || 
|-id=121 bgcolor=#E9E9E9
| 286121 ||  || — || October 10, 2001 || Palomar || NEAT || — || align=right | 2.6 km || 
|-id=122 bgcolor=#fefefe
| 286122 ||  || — || October 10, 2001 || Palomar || NEAT || — || align=right | 1.4 km || 
|-id=123 bgcolor=#fefefe
| 286123 ||  || — || October 10, 2001 || Palomar || NEAT || — || align=right data-sort-value="0.83" | 830 m || 
|-id=124 bgcolor=#fefefe
| 286124 ||  || — || October 10, 2001 || Palomar || NEAT || — || align=right | 1.1 km || 
|-id=125 bgcolor=#fefefe
| 286125 ||  || — || October 10, 2001 || Palomar || NEAT || FLO || align=right data-sort-value="0.85" | 850 m || 
|-id=126 bgcolor=#d6d6d6
| 286126 ||  || — || October 13, 2001 || Kitt Peak || Spacewatch || — || align=right | 3.8 km || 
|-id=127 bgcolor=#d6d6d6
| 286127 ||  || — || October 13, 2001 || Kitt Peak || Spacewatch || — || align=right | 4.0 km || 
|-id=128 bgcolor=#fefefe
| 286128 ||  || — || October 15, 2001 || Kitt Peak || Spacewatch || — || align=right | 1.1 km || 
|-id=129 bgcolor=#fefefe
| 286129 ||  || — || October 11, 2001 || Palomar || NEAT || — || align=right | 1.0 km || 
|-id=130 bgcolor=#d6d6d6
| 286130 ||  || — || October 11, 2001 || Palomar || NEAT || — || align=right | 3.6 km || 
|-id=131 bgcolor=#fefefe
| 286131 ||  || — || October 11, 2001 || Palomar || NEAT || — || align=right data-sort-value="0.75" | 750 m || 
|-id=132 bgcolor=#E9E9E9
| 286132 ||  || — || October 15, 2001 || Palomar || NEAT || RAF || align=right | 1.2 km || 
|-id=133 bgcolor=#E9E9E9
| 286133 ||  || — || October 14, 2001 || Socorro || LINEAR || — || align=right | 2.7 km || 
|-id=134 bgcolor=#d6d6d6
| 286134 ||  || — || October 14, 2001 || Socorro || LINEAR || EOS || align=right | 2.3 km || 
|-id=135 bgcolor=#d6d6d6
| 286135 ||  || — || October 14, 2001 || Socorro || LINEAR || — || align=right | 4.5 km || 
|-id=136 bgcolor=#d6d6d6
| 286136 ||  || — || October 14, 2001 || Socorro || LINEAR || EOS || align=right | 2.8 km || 
|-id=137 bgcolor=#d6d6d6
| 286137 ||  || — || October 14, 2001 || Socorro || LINEAR || — || align=right | 2.9 km || 
|-id=138 bgcolor=#d6d6d6
| 286138 ||  || — || October 14, 2001 || Socorro || LINEAR || — || align=right | 3.5 km || 
|-id=139 bgcolor=#E9E9E9
| 286139 ||  || — || October 14, 2001 || Socorro || LINEAR || — || align=right | 4.6 km || 
|-id=140 bgcolor=#fefefe
| 286140 ||  || — || October 15, 2001 || Socorro || LINEAR || — || align=right | 1.0 km || 
|-id=141 bgcolor=#d6d6d6
| 286141 ||  || — || October 15, 2001 || Palomar || NEAT || — || align=right | 4.4 km || 
|-id=142 bgcolor=#E9E9E9
| 286142 ||  || — || October 11, 2001 || Socorro || LINEAR || GEF || align=right | 2.1 km || 
|-id=143 bgcolor=#d6d6d6
| 286143 ||  || — || October 11, 2001 || Socorro || LINEAR || — || align=right | 3.2 km || 
|-id=144 bgcolor=#fefefe
| 286144 ||  || — || October 11, 2001 || Palomar || NEAT || — || align=right data-sort-value="0.78" | 780 m || 
|-id=145 bgcolor=#E9E9E9
| 286145 ||  || — || September 19, 2001 || Kitt Peak || Spacewatch || MIS || align=right | 2.1 km || 
|-id=146 bgcolor=#fefefe
| 286146 ||  || — || October 11, 2001 || Palomar || NEAT || — || align=right data-sort-value="0.95" | 950 m || 
|-id=147 bgcolor=#E9E9E9
| 286147 ||  || — || October 13, 2001 || Palomar || NEAT || — || align=right | 2.3 km || 
|-id=148 bgcolor=#fefefe
| 286148 ||  || — || October 14, 2001 || Ondřejov || Ondřejov Obs. || MAS || align=right data-sort-value="0.79" | 790 m || 
|-id=149 bgcolor=#E9E9E9
| 286149 ||  || — || October 14, 2001 || Socorro || LINEAR || NEM || align=right | 2.6 km || 
|-id=150 bgcolor=#E9E9E9
| 286150 ||  || — || October 14, 2001 || Socorro || LINEAR || RAF || align=right data-sort-value="0.81" | 810 m || 
|-id=151 bgcolor=#d6d6d6
| 286151 ||  || — || October 15, 2001 || Haleakala || NEAT || — || align=right | 6.7 km || 
|-id=152 bgcolor=#E9E9E9
| 286152 ||  || — || October 15, 2001 || Palomar || NEAT || — || align=right | 3.6 km || 
|-id=153 bgcolor=#E9E9E9
| 286153 ||  || — || October 15, 2001 || Palomar || NEAT || MAR || align=right | 1.2 km || 
|-id=154 bgcolor=#d6d6d6
| 286154 ||  || — || October 14, 2001 || Socorro || LINEAR || — || align=right | 5.0 km || 
|-id=155 bgcolor=#E9E9E9
| 286155 ||  || — || October 14, 2001 || Apache Point || SDSS || — || align=right | 1.1 km || 
|-id=156 bgcolor=#fefefe
| 286156 ||  || — || October 14, 2001 || Apache Point || SDSS || — || align=right data-sort-value="0.72" | 720 m || 
|-id=157 bgcolor=#E9E9E9
| 286157 ||  || — || October 14, 2001 || Apache Point || SDSS || critical || align=right data-sort-value="0.86" | 860 m || 
|-id=158 bgcolor=#fefefe
| 286158 ||  || — || October 14, 2001 || Apache Point || SDSS || — || align=right | 1.2 km || 
|-id=159 bgcolor=#E9E9E9
| 286159 ||  || — || October 14, 2001 || Apache Point || SDSS || — || align=right | 2.7 km || 
|-id=160 bgcolor=#E9E9E9
| 286160 ||  || — || October 10, 2001 || Palomar || NEAT || — || align=right | 1.8 km || 
|-id=161 bgcolor=#d6d6d6
| 286161 ||  || — || October 10, 2001 || Palomar || NEAT || — || align=right | 2.8 km || 
|-id=162 bgcolor=#E9E9E9
| 286162 Tatarka ||  ||  || October 8, 2001 || Palomar || NEAT || — || align=right | 2.3 km || 
|-id=163 bgcolor=#fefefe
| 286163 Begeni ||  ||  || October 11, 2001 || Palomar || NEAT || H || align=right data-sort-value="0.62" | 620 m || 
|-id=164 bgcolor=#fefefe
| 286164 ||  || — || October 16, 2001 || Socorro || LINEAR || PHO || align=right | 2.1 km || 
|-id=165 bgcolor=#fefefe
| 286165 ||  || — || October 18, 2001 || Desert Eagle || W. K. Y. Yeung || FLO || align=right data-sort-value="0.94" | 940 m || 
|-id=166 bgcolor=#d6d6d6
| 286166 ||  || — || October 17, 2001 || Socorro || LINEAR || EOS || align=right | 2.4 km || 
|-id=167 bgcolor=#d6d6d6
| 286167 ||  || — || October 17, 2001 || Socorro || LINEAR || — || align=right | 2.7 km || 
|-id=168 bgcolor=#FA8072
| 286168 ||  || — || October 23, 2001 || Desert Eagle || W. K. Y. Yeung || — || align=right | 1.0 km || 
|-id=169 bgcolor=#fefefe
| 286169 ||  || — || October 25, 2001 || Desert Eagle || W. K. Y. Yeung || FLO || align=right data-sort-value="0.80" | 800 m || 
|-id=170 bgcolor=#E9E9E9
| 286170 ||  || — || October 18, 2001 || Socorro || LINEAR || JUN || align=right | 1.3 km || 
|-id=171 bgcolor=#d6d6d6
| 286171 ||  || — || October 18, 2001 || Kitt Peak || Spacewatch || CHA || align=right | 2.1 km || 
|-id=172 bgcolor=#E9E9E9
| 286172 ||  || — || October 17, 2001 || Palomar || NEAT || INO || align=right | 1.9 km || 
|-id=173 bgcolor=#fefefe
| 286173 ||  || — || October 17, 2001 || Socorro || LINEAR || MAS || align=right | 1.1 km || 
|-id=174 bgcolor=#fefefe
| 286174 ||  || — || October 17, 2001 || Socorro || LINEAR || MAS || align=right data-sort-value="0.83" | 830 m || 
|-id=175 bgcolor=#d6d6d6
| 286175 ||  || — || October 17, 2001 || Socorro || LINEAR || — || align=right | 3.0 km || 
|-id=176 bgcolor=#E9E9E9
| 286176 ||  || — || October 17, 2001 || Socorro || LINEAR || — || align=right | 2.4 km || 
|-id=177 bgcolor=#fefefe
| 286177 ||  || — || October 17, 2001 || Socorro || LINEAR || MAS || align=right data-sort-value="0.90" | 900 m || 
|-id=178 bgcolor=#d6d6d6
| 286178 ||  || — || October 17, 2001 || Socorro || LINEAR || — || align=right | 4.0 km || 
|-id=179 bgcolor=#d6d6d6
| 286179 ||  || — || October 17, 2001 || Socorro || LINEAR || — || align=right | 4.1 km || 
|-id=180 bgcolor=#fefefe
| 286180 ||  || — || October 17, 2001 || Socorro || LINEAR || — || align=right data-sort-value="0.92" | 920 m || 
|-id=181 bgcolor=#d6d6d6
| 286181 ||  || — || October 17, 2001 || Socorro || LINEAR || — || align=right | 4.5 km || 
|-id=182 bgcolor=#fefefe
| 286182 ||  || — || October 17, 2001 || Socorro || LINEAR || — || align=right | 1.0 km || 
|-id=183 bgcolor=#E9E9E9
| 286183 ||  || — || October 17, 2001 || Socorro || LINEAR || — || align=right | 3.0 km || 
|-id=184 bgcolor=#d6d6d6
| 286184 ||  || — || October 17, 2001 || Socorro || LINEAR || — || align=right | 3.7 km || 
|-id=185 bgcolor=#fefefe
| 286185 ||  || — || October 20, 2001 || Socorro || LINEAR || FLO || align=right data-sort-value="0.78" | 780 m || 
|-id=186 bgcolor=#E9E9E9
| 286186 ||  || — || October 17, 2001 || Socorro || LINEAR || — || align=right | 1.4 km || 
|-id=187 bgcolor=#d6d6d6
| 286187 ||  || — || October 17, 2001 || Socorro || LINEAR || — || align=right | 3.1 km || 
|-id=188 bgcolor=#fefefe
| 286188 ||  || — || October 17, 2001 || Socorro || LINEAR || — || align=right data-sort-value="0.91" | 910 m || 
|-id=189 bgcolor=#E9E9E9
| 286189 ||  || — || October 17, 2001 || Socorro || LINEAR || — || align=right | 2.6 km || 
|-id=190 bgcolor=#fefefe
| 286190 ||  || — || October 17, 2001 || Socorro || LINEAR || — || align=right data-sort-value="0.80" | 800 m || 
|-id=191 bgcolor=#d6d6d6
| 286191 ||  || — || October 17, 2001 || Socorro || LINEAR || — || align=right | 3.6 km || 
|-id=192 bgcolor=#fefefe
| 286192 ||  || — || October 17, 2001 || Socorro || LINEAR || — || align=right data-sort-value="0.88" | 880 m || 
|-id=193 bgcolor=#fefefe
| 286193 ||  || — || October 18, 2001 || Socorro || LINEAR || — || align=right data-sort-value="0.92" | 920 m || 
|-id=194 bgcolor=#d6d6d6
| 286194 ||  || — || October 18, 2001 || Socorro || LINEAR || LUT || align=right | 6.9 km || 
|-id=195 bgcolor=#fefefe
| 286195 ||  || — || October 20, 2001 || Socorro || LINEAR || — || align=right data-sort-value="0.61" | 610 m || 
|-id=196 bgcolor=#d6d6d6
| 286196 ||  || — || October 20, 2001 || Socorro || LINEAR || — || align=right | 3.7 km || 
|-id=197 bgcolor=#fefefe
| 286197 ||  || — || October 20, 2001 || Socorro || LINEAR || FLO || align=right | 1.1 km || 
|-id=198 bgcolor=#fefefe
| 286198 ||  || — || October 20, 2001 || Socorro || LINEAR || — || align=right | 1.0 km || 
|-id=199 bgcolor=#E9E9E9
| 286199 ||  || — || October 20, 2001 || Socorro || LINEAR || — || align=right | 1.2 km || 
|-id=200 bgcolor=#C2FFFF
| 286200 ||  || — || October 17, 2001 || Kitt Peak || Spacewatch || L5 || align=right | 13 km || 
|}

286201–286300 

|-bgcolor=#fefefe
| 286201 ||  || — || October 17, 2001 || Kitt Peak || Spacewatch || FLO || align=right data-sort-value="0.64" | 640 m || 
|-id=202 bgcolor=#fefefe
| 286202 ||  || — || October 20, 2001 || Socorro || LINEAR || — || align=right | 1.1 km || 
|-id=203 bgcolor=#fefefe
| 286203 ||  || — || October 20, 2001 || Socorro || LINEAR || NYS || align=right data-sort-value="0.86" | 860 m || 
|-id=204 bgcolor=#E9E9E9
| 286204 ||  || — || October 16, 2001 || Kitt Peak || Spacewatch || — || align=right | 1.6 km || 
|-id=205 bgcolor=#E9E9E9
| 286205 ||  || — || October 16, 2001 || Kitt Peak || Spacewatch || HEN || align=right | 1.2 km || 
|-id=206 bgcolor=#d6d6d6
| 286206 ||  || — || October 16, 2001 || Palomar || NEAT || HYG || align=right | 3.6 km || 
|-id=207 bgcolor=#fefefe
| 286207 ||  || — || October 21, 2001 || Kitt Peak || Spacewatch || NYS || align=right data-sort-value="0.74" | 740 m || 
|-id=208 bgcolor=#E9E9E9
| 286208 ||  || — || October 23, 2001 || Kitt Peak || Spacewatch || HOF || align=right | 2.4 km || 
|-id=209 bgcolor=#d6d6d6
| 286209 ||  || — || October 18, 2001 || Palomar || NEAT || — || align=right | 4.2 km || 
|-id=210 bgcolor=#E9E9E9
| 286210 ||  || — || October 19, 2001 || Haleakala || NEAT || — || align=right | 2.6 km || 
|-id=211 bgcolor=#E9E9E9
| 286211 ||  || — || October 16, 2001 || Socorro || LINEAR || — || align=right | 2.2 km || 
|-id=212 bgcolor=#d6d6d6
| 286212 ||  || — || October 17, 2001 || Socorro || LINEAR || — || align=right | 3.9 km || 
|-id=213 bgcolor=#d6d6d6
| 286213 ||  || — || October 17, 2001 || Socorro || LINEAR || EOS || align=right | 2.4 km || 
|-id=214 bgcolor=#E9E9E9
| 286214 ||  || — || October 20, 2001 || Socorro || LINEAR || — || align=right | 2.5 km || 
|-id=215 bgcolor=#E9E9E9
| 286215 ||  || — || October 20, 2001 || Socorro || LINEAR || — || align=right | 1.6 km || 
|-id=216 bgcolor=#d6d6d6
| 286216 ||  || — || October 20, 2001 || Socorro || LINEAR || — || align=right | 3.8 km || 
|-id=217 bgcolor=#fefefe
| 286217 ||  || — || October 20, 2001 || Socorro || LINEAR || — || align=right | 1.0 km || 
|-id=218 bgcolor=#fefefe
| 286218 ||  || — || October 20, 2001 || Socorro || LINEAR || MAS || align=right | 1.0 km || 
|-id=219 bgcolor=#fefefe
| 286219 ||  || — || October 22, 2001 || Socorro || LINEAR || — || align=right data-sort-value="0.80" | 800 m || 
|-id=220 bgcolor=#fefefe
| 286220 ||  || — || October 22, 2001 || Socorro || LINEAR || — || align=right data-sort-value="0.95" | 950 m || 
|-id=221 bgcolor=#d6d6d6
| 286221 ||  || — || October 22, 2001 || Socorro || LINEAR || EUP || align=right | 5.6 km || 
|-id=222 bgcolor=#fefefe
| 286222 ||  || — || October 22, 2001 || Socorro || LINEAR || — || align=right data-sort-value="0.91" | 910 m || 
|-id=223 bgcolor=#d6d6d6
| 286223 ||  || — || October 22, 2001 || Palomar || NEAT || — || align=right | 4.3 km || 
|-id=224 bgcolor=#fefefe
| 286224 ||  || — || October 20, 2001 || Socorro || LINEAR || MAS || align=right data-sort-value="0.90" | 900 m || 
|-id=225 bgcolor=#E9E9E9
| 286225 ||  || — || October 20, 2001 || Socorro || LINEAR || — || align=right | 1.9 km || 
|-id=226 bgcolor=#d6d6d6
| 286226 ||  || — || October 21, 2001 || Socorro || LINEAR || — || align=right | 3.0 km || 
|-id=227 bgcolor=#C2FFFF
| 286227 ||  || — || October 23, 2001 || Socorro || LINEAR || L5 || align=right | 12 km || 
|-id=228 bgcolor=#d6d6d6
| 286228 ||  || — || October 23, 2001 || Socorro || LINEAR || — || align=right | 3.3 km || 
|-id=229 bgcolor=#fefefe
| 286229 ||  || — || October 23, 2001 || Socorro || LINEAR || NYS || align=right data-sort-value="0.71" | 710 m || 
|-id=230 bgcolor=#d6d6d6
| 286230 ||  || — || October 23, 2001 || Socorro || LINEAR || HYG || align=right | 4.2 km || 
|-id=231 bgcolor=#d6d6d6
| 286231 ||  || — || October 18, 2001 || Palomar || NEAT || — || align=right | 3.4 km || 
|-id=232 bgcolor=#E9E9E9
| 286232 ||  || — || October 19, 2001 || Socorro || LINEAR || — || align=right | 3.1 km || 
|-id=233 bgcolor=#E9E9E9
| 286233 ||  || — || October 18, 2001 || Palomar || NEAT || WIT || align=right | 1.2 km || 
|-id=234 bgcolor=#d6d6d6
| 286234 ||  || — || October 18, 2001 || Palomar || NEAT || EOS || align=right | 2.1 km || 
|-id=235 bgcolor=#E9E9E9
| 286235 ||  || — || October 18, 2001 || Palomar || NEAT || — || align=right | 2.2 km || 
|-id=236 bgcolor=#fefefe
| 286236 ||  || — || October 21, 2001 || Socorro || LINEAR || NYS || align=right data-sort-value="0.79" | 790 m || 
|-id=237 bgcolor=#E9E9E9
| 286237 ||  || — || October 17, 2001 || Palomar || NEAT || — || align=right | 3.0 km || 
|-id=238 bgcolor=#d6d6d6
| 286238 ||  || — || October 18, 2001 || Palomar || NEAT || — || align=right | 2.7 km || 
|-id=239 bgcolor=#E9E9E9
| 286239 ||  || — || October 18, 2001 || Palomar || NEAT || SHF || align=right | 1.6 km || 
|-id=240 bgcolor=#E9E9E9
| 286240 ||  || — || October 19, 2001 || Palomar || NEAT || PAD || align=right | 2.8 km || 
|-id=241 bgcolor=#fefefe
| 286241 ||  || — || October 19, 2001 || Palomar || NEAT || — || align=right data-sort-value="0.78" | 780 m || 
|-id=242 bgcolor=#E9E9E9
| 286242 ||  || — || October 19, 2001 || Palomar || NEAT || — || align=right | 2.2 km || 
|-id=243 bgcolor=#fefefe
| 286243 ||  || — || October 19, 2001 || Palomar || NEAT || FLO || align=right data-sort-value="0.83" | 830 m || 
|-id=244 bgcolor=#d6d6d6
| 286244 ||  || — || October 21, 2001 || Socorro || LINEAR || HYG || align=right | 3.0 km || 
|-id=245 bgcolor=#fefefe
| 286245 ||  || — || October 21, 2001 || Socorro || LINEAR || V || align=right data-sort-value="0.89" | 890 m || 
|-id=246 bgcolor=#E9E9E9
| 286246 ||  || — || October 21, 2001 || Socorro || LINEAR || — || align=right | 1.5 km || 
|-id=247 bgcolor=#d6d6d6
| 286247 ||  || — || October 21, 2001 || Kitt Peak || Spacewatch || — || align=right | 3.8 km || 
|-id=248 bgcolor=#E9E9E9
| 286248 ||  || — || October 24, 2001 || Socorro || LINEAR || HEN || align=right | 1.4 km || 
|-id=249 bgcolor=#E9E9E9
| 286249 ||  || — || October 24, 2001 || Socorro || LINEAR || — || align=right data-sort-value="0.95" | 950 m || 
|-id=250 bgcolor=#d6d6d6
| 286250 ||  || — || October 24, 2001 || Socorro || LINEAR || — || align=right | 3.8 km || 
|-id=251 bgcolor=#d6d6d6
| 286251 ||  || — || October 16, 2001 || Kitt Peak || Spacewatch || — || align=right | 5.0 km || 
|-id=252 bgcolor=#E9E9E9
| 286252 ||  || — || October 24, 2001 || Socorro || LINEAR || — || align=right | 2.4 km || 
|-id=253 bgcolor=#E9E9E9
| 286253 ||  || — || October 17, 2001 || Socorro || LINEAR || PAE || align=right | 2.8 km || 
|-id=254 bgcolor=#E9E9E9
| 286254 ||  || — || October 16, 2001 || Palomar || NEAT || — || align=right | 1.8 km || 
|-id=255 bgcolor=#E9E9E9
| 286255 ||  || — || October 16, 2001 || Palomar || NEAT || WIT || align=right | 1.2 km || 
|-id=256 bgcolor=#E9E9E9
| 286256 ||  || — || October 16, 2001 || Palomar || NEAT || — || align=right | 2.3 km || 
|-id=257 bgcolor=#fefefe
| 286257 ||  || — || October 16, 2001 || Palomar || NEAT || — || align=right data-sort-value="0.91" | 910 m || 
|-id=258 bgcolor=#d6d6d6
| 286258 ||  || — || October 17, 2001 || Palomar || NEAT || — || align=right | 3.1 km || 
|-id=259 bgcolor=#fefefe
| 286259 ||  || — || November 11, 2001 || Kitt Peak || Spacewatch || V || align=right data-sort-value="0.62" | 620 m || 
|-id=260 bgcolor=#E9E9E9
| 286260 ||  || — || November 9, 2001 || Socorro || LINEAR || NEM || align=right | 2.4 km || 
|-id=261 bgcolor=#fefefe
| 286261 ||  || — || November 9, 2001 || Socorro || LINEAR || — || align=right data-sort-value="0.75" | 750 m || 
|-id=262 bgcolor=#fefefe
| 286262 ||  || — || November 12, 2001 || Emerald Lane || L. Ball || — || align=right | 1.1 km || 
|-id=263 bgcolor=#fefefe
| 286263 ||  || — || November 9, 2001 || Socorro || LINEAR || — || align=right | 1.1 km || 
|-id=264 bgcolor=#fefefe
| 286264 ||  || — || November 9, 2001 || Socorro || LINEAR || — || align=right data-sort-value="0.93" | 930 m || 
|-id=265 bgcolor=#d6d6d6
| 286265 ||  || — || November 9, 2001 || Socorro || LINEAR || — || align=right | 5.3 km || 
|-id=266 bgcolor=#fefefe
| 286266 ||  || — || November 9, 2001 || Socorro || LINEAR || FLO || align=right data-sort-value="0.87" | 870 m || 
|-id=267 bgcolor=#d6d6d6
| 286267 ||  || — || November 10, 2001 || Socorro || LINEAR || — || align=right | 5.1 km || 
|-id=268 bgcolor=#d6d6d6
| 286268 ||  || — || November 10, 2001 || Socorro || LINEAR || NAE || align=right | 4.6 km || 
|-id=269 bgcolor=#d6d6d6
| 286269 ||  || — || November 10, 2001 || Socorro || LINEAR || — || align=right | 3.7 km || 
|-id=270 bgcolor=#d6d6d6
| 286270 ||  || — || November 11, 2001 || Socorro || LINEAR || FIR || align=right | 3.2 km || 
|-id=271 bgcolor=#fefefe
| 286271 ||  || — || November 11, 2001 || Socorro || LINEAR || FLO || align=right data-sort-value="0.94" | 940 m || 
|-id=272 bgcolor=#d6d6d6
| 286272 ||  || — || November 12, 2001 || Kitt Peak || Spacewatch || — || align=right | 2.6 km || 
|-id=273 bgcolor=#FA8072
| 286273 ||  || — || November 15, 2001 || Socorro || LINEAR || PHO || align=right | 1.4 km || 
|-id=274 bgcolor=#fefefe
| 286274 ||  || — || November 11, 2001 || Kitt Peak || Spacewatch || NYS || align=right | 1.6 km || 
|-id=275 bgcolor=#fefefe
| 286275 ||  || — || November 12, 2001 || Socorro || LINEAR || PHO || align=right | 1.4 km || 
|-id=276 bgcolor=#d6d6d6
| 286276 ||  || — || November 12, 2001 || Socorro || LINEAR || — || align=right | 3.8 km || 
|-id=277 bgcolor=#fefefe
| 286277 ||  || — || November 15, 2001 || Socorro || LINEAR || H || align=right | 1.3 km || 
|-id=278 bgcolor=#E9E9E9
| 286278 ||  || — || November 11, 2001 || Kitt Peak || Spacewatch || — || align=right | 3.4 km || 
|-id=279 bgcolor=#d6d6d6
| 286279 ||  || — || November 15, 2001 || Socorro || LINEAR || — || align=right | 3.3 km || 
|-id=280 bgcolor=#d6d6d6
| 286280 ||  || — || November 12, 2001 || Anderson Mesa || LONEOS || EMA || align=right | 4.6 km || 
|-id=281 bgcolor=#fefefe
| 286281 ||  || — || November 12, 2001 || Socorro || LINEAR || FLO || align=right data-sort-value="0.80" | 800 m || 
|-id=282 bgcolor=#fefefe
| 286282 ||  || — || November 12, 2001 || Socorro || LINEAR || NYS || align=right data-sort-value="0.71" | 710 m || 
|-id=283 bgcolor=#fefefe
| 286283 ||  || — || November 12, 2001 || Socorro || LINEAR || NYS || align=right data-sort-value="0.76" | 760 m || 
|-id=284 bgcolor=#E9E9E9
| 286284 ||  || — || November 12, 2001 || Socorro || LINEAR || — || align=right | 2.7 km || 
|-id=285 bgcolor=#d6d6d6
| 286285 ||  || — || November 12, 2001 || Socorro || LINEAR || — || align=right | 5.1 km || 
|-id=286 bgcolor=#d6d6d6
| 286286 ||  || — || November 12, 2001 || Socorro || LINEAR || — || align=right | 4.7 km || 
|-id=287 bgcolor=#fefefe
| 286287 ||  || — || November 9, 2001 || Socorro || LINEAR || — || align=right data-sort-value="0.69" | 690 m || 
|-id=288 bgcolor=#d6d6d6
| 286288 ||  || — || November 14, 2001 || Kitt Peak || Spacewatch || EOS || align=right | 2.8 km || 
|-id=289 bgcolor=#fefefe
| 286289 ||  || — || November 14, 2001 || Kitt Peak || Spacewatch || — || align=right data-sort-value="0.87" | 870 m || 
|-id=290 bgcolor=#E9E9E9
| 286290 ||  || — || November 15, 2001 || Socorro || LINEAR || — || align=right | 3.4 km || 
|-id=291 bgcolor=#d6d6d6
| 286291 ||  || — || November 11, 2001 || Apache Point || SDSS || — || align=right | 3.9 km || 
|-id=292 bgcolor=#E9E9E9
| 286292 ||  || — || November 12, 2001 || Apache Point || SDSS || — || align=right | 1.7 km || 
|-id=293 bgcolor=#fefefe
| 286293 ||  || — || November 12, 2001 || Apache Point || SDSS || — || align=right data-sort-value="0.94" | 940 m || 
|-id=294 bgcolor=#d6d6d6
| 286294 ||  || — || November 12, 2001 || Apache Point || SDSS || — || align=right | 3.9 km || 
|-id=295 bgcolor=#fefefe
| 286295 ||  || — || November 17, 2001 || Socorro || LINEAR || FLO || align=right data-sort-value="0.67" | 670 m || 
|-id=296 bgcolor=#fefefe
| 286296 ||  || — || November 17, 2001 || Socorro || LINEAR || — || align=right data-sort-value="0.86" | 860 m || 
|-id=297 bgcolor=#d6d6d6
| 286297 ||  || — || November 17, 2001 || Socorro || LINEAR || — || align=right | 4.3 km || 
|-id=298 bgcolor=#E9E9E9
| 286298 ||  || — || November 17, 2001 || Socorro || LINEAR || — || align=right | 2.7 km || 
|-id=299 bgcolor=#fefefe
| 286299 ||  || — || November 17, 2001 || Socorro || LINEAR || NYS || align=right data-sort-value="0.91" | 910 m || 
|-id=300 bgcolor=#d6d6d6
| 286300 ||  || — || November 17, 2001 || Socorro || LINEAR || — || align=right | 3.5 km || 
|}

286301–286400 

|-bgcolor=#d6d6d6
| 286301 ||  || — || November 17, 2001 || Socorro || LINEAR || — || align=right | 3.5 km || 
|-id=302 bgcolor=#E9E9E9
| 286302 ||  || — || November 17, 2001 || Socorro || LINEAR || — || align=right | 2.5 km || 
|-id=303 bgcolor=#fefefe
| 286303 ||  || — || November 17, 2001 || Socorro || LINEAR || — || align=right data-sort-value="0.89" | 890 m || 
|-id=304 bgcolor=#fefefe
| 286304 ||  || — || November 17, 2001 || Socorro || LINEAR || NYS || align=right data-sort-value="0.71" | 710 m || 
|-id=305 bgcolor=#fefefe
| 286305 ||  || — || November 17, 2001 || Socorro || LINEAR || — || align=right data-sort-value="0.85" | 850 m || 
|-id=306 bgcolor=#E9E9E9
| 286306 ||  || — || November 17, 2001 || Socorro || LINEAR || — || align=right | 2.5 km || 
|-id=307 bgcolor=#d6d6d6
| 286307 ||  || — || November 18, 2001 || Socorro || LINEAR || HYG || align=right | 3.5 km || 
|-id=308 bgcolor=#fefefe
| 286308 ||  || — || November 19, 2001 || Socorro || LINEAR || — || align=right data-sort-value="0.66" | 660 m || 
|-id=309 bgcolor=#d6d6d6
| 286309 ||  || — || November 19, 2001 || Socorro || LINEAR || — || align=right | 4.0 km || 
|-id=310 bgcolor=#C2FFFF
| 286310 ||  || — || November 19, 2001 || Socorro || LINEAR || L5 || align=right | 11 km || 
|-id=311 bgcolor=#fefefe
| 286311 ||  || — || November 19, 2001 || Socorro || LINEAR || — || align=right data-sort-value="0.77" | 770 m || 
|-id=312 bgcolor=#fefefe
| 286312 ||  || — || November 19, 2001 || Socorro || LINEAR || — || align=right data-sort-value="0.76" | 760 m || 
|-id=313 bgcolor=#E9E9E9
| 286313 ||  || — || November 19, 2001 || Socorro || LINEAR || — || align=right | 2.9 km || 
|-id=314 bgcolor=#E9E9E9
| 286314 ||  || — || November 20, 2001 || Socorro || LINEAR || — || align=right | 2.2 km || 
|-id=315 bgcolor=#fefefe
| 286315 ||  || — || November 20, 2001 || Socorro || LINEAR || — || align=right | 1.0 km || 
|-id=316 bgcolor=#fefefe
| 286316 ||  || — || November 20, 2001 || Socorro || LINEAR || MAS || align=right data-sort-value="0.71" | 710 m || 
|-id=317 bgcolor=#fefefe
| 286317 ||  || — || November 20, 2001 || Socorro || LINEAR || MAS || align=right data-sort-value="0.85" | 850 m || 
|-id=318 bgcolor=#d6d6d6
| 286318 ||  || — || November 20, 2001 || Socorro || LINEAR || — || align=right | 3.7 km || 
|-id=319 bgcolor=#d6d6d6
| 286319 ||  || — || November 20, 2001 || Socorro || LINEAR || — || align=right | 4.1 km || 
|-id=320 bgcolor=#E9E9E9
| 286320 ||  || — || November 20, 2001 || Socorro || LINEAR || — || align=right | 2.8 km || 
|-id=321 bgcolor=#E9E9E9
| 286321 ||  || — || November 20, 2001 || Socorro || LINEAR || — || align=right | 1.5 km || 
|-id=322 bgcolor=#d6d6d6
| 286322 ||  || — || November 20, 2001 || Socorro || LINEAR || — || align=right | 3.7 km || 
|-id=323 bgcolor=#d6d6d6
| 286323 ||  || — || November 21, 2001 || Socorro || LINEAR || — || align=right | 4.3 km || 
|-id=324 bgcolor=#E9E9E9
| 286324 ||  || — || November 20, 2001 || Socorro || LINEAR || VIB || align=right | 2.3 km || 
|-id=325 bgcolor=#E9E9E9
| 286325 ||  || — || November 20, 2001 || Socorro || LINEAR || — || align=right | 1.6 km || 
|-id=326 bgcolor=#E9E9E9
| 286326 ||  || — || November 20, 2001 || Socorro || LINEAR || EUN || align=right | 1.5 km || 
|-id=327 bgcolor=#fefefe
| 286327 ||  || — || November 17, 2001 || Kitt Peak || Spacewatch || — || align=right data-sort-value="0.83" | 830 m || 
|-id=328 bgcolor=#fefefe
| 286328 ||  || — || December 9, 2001 || Socorro || LINEAR || PHO || align=right | 1.7 km || 
|-id=329 bgcolor=#fefefe
| 286329 ||  || — || December 9, 2001 || Socorro || LINEAR || — || align=right data-sort-value="0.97" | 970 m || 
|-id=330 bgcolor=#d6d6d6
| 286330 ||  || — || December 9, 2001 || Socorro || LINEAR || — || align=right | 3.0 km || 
|-id=331 bgcolor=#d6d6d6
| 286331 ||  || — || December 9, 2001 || Socorro || LINEAR || — || align=right | 5.1 km || 
|-id=332 bgcolor=#E9E9E9
| 286332 ||  || — || December 9, 2001 || Socorro || LINEAR || JUN || align=right | 1.2 km || 
|-id=333 bgcolor=#d6d6d6
| 286333 ||  || — || December 9, 2001 || Socorro || LINEAR || BRA || align=right | 1.8 km || 
|-id=334 bgcolor=#d6d6d6
| 286334 ||  || — || December 9, 2001 || Socorro || LINEAR || — || align=right | 3.3 km || 
|-id=335 bgcolor=#d6d6d6
| 286335 ||  || — || December 10, 2001 || Socorro || LINEAR || EUP || align=right | 6.8 km || 
|-id=336 bgcolor=#fefefe
| 286336 ||  || — || December 11, 2001 || Socorro || LINEAR || — || align=right | 1.3 km || 
|-id=337 bgcolor=#E9E9E9
| 286337 ||  || — || December 7, 2001 || Kitt Peak || Spacewatch || — || align=right | 2.9 km || 
|-id=338 bgcolor=#d6d6d6
| 286338 ||  || — || December 9, 2001 || Socorro || LINEAR || BRA || align=right | 2.3 km || 
|-id=339 bgcolor=#d6d6d6
| 286339 ||  || — || December 9, 2001 || Socorro || LINEAR || EMA || align=right | 6.8 km || 
|-id=340 bgcolor=#d6d6d6
| 286340 ||  || — || December 9, 2001 || Socorro || LINEAR || — || align=right | 5.0 km || 
|-id=341 bgcolor=#E9E9E9
| 286341 ||  || — || December 10, 2001 || Socorro || LINEAR || — || align=right data-sort-value="0.94" | 940 m || 
|-id=342 bgcolor=#d6d6d6
| 286342 ||  || — || December 11, 2001 || Socorro || LINEAR || — || align=right | 4.3 km || 
|-id=343 bgcolor=#E9E9E9
| 286343 ||  || — || December 11, 2001 || Socorro || LINEAR || — || align=right | 2.3 km || 
|-id=344 bgcolor=#d6d6d6
| 286344 ||  || — || December 10, 2001 || Socorro || LINEAR || critical || align=right | 2.5 km || 
|-id=345 bgcolor=#E9E9E9
| 286345 ||  || — || December 10, 2001 || Socorro || LINEAR || — || align=right | 1.9 km || 
|-id=346 bgcolor=#d6d6d6
| 286346 ||  || — || December 10, 2001 || Socorro || LINEAR || — || align=right | 5.9 km || 
|-id=347 bgcolor=#fefefe
| 286347 ||  || — || December 11, 2001 || Socorro || LINEAR || H || align=right data-sort-value="0.84" | 840 m || 
|-id=348 bgcolor=#E9E9E9
| 286348 ||  || — || December 14, 2001 || Socorro || LINEAR || — || align=right | 3.3 km || 
|-id=349 bgcolor=#d6d6d6
| 286349 ||  || — || December 14, 2001 || Socorro || LINEAR || EOS || align=right | 2.9 km || 
|-id=350 bgcolor=#d6d6d6
| 286350 ||  || — || December 14, 2001 || Socorro || LINEAR || EOS || align=right | 2.7 km || 
|-id=351 bgcolor=#d6d6d6
| 286351 ||  || — || December 14, 2001 || Socorro || LINEAR || EOS || align=right | 2.8 km || 
|-id=352 bgcolor=#E9E9E9
| 286352 ||  || — || December 14, 2001 || Socorro || LINEAR || MAR || align=right | 1.4 km || 
|-id=353 bgcolor=#fefefe
| 286353 ||  || — || December 14, 2001 || Socorro || LINEAR || NYS || align=right data-sort-value="0.83" | 830 m || 
|-id=354 bgcolor=#fefefe
| 286354 ||  || — || December 14, 2001 || Socorro || LINEAR || — || align=right data-sort-value="0.98" | 980 m || 
|-id=355 bgcolor=#E9E9E9
| 286355 ||  || — || December 14, 2001 || Socorro || LINEAR || — || align=right | 1.7 km || 
|-id=356 bgcolor=#fefefe
| 286356 ||  || — || December 14, 2001 || Socorro || LINEAR || — || align=right | 1.0 km || 
|-id=357 bgcolor=#E9E9E9
| 286357 ||  || — || December 14, 2001 || Socorro || LINEAR || — || align=right | 1.9 km || 
|-id=358 bgcolor=#d6d6d6
| 286358 ||  || — || December 14, 2001 || Socorro || LINEAR || — || align=right | 2.5 km || 
|-id=359 bgcolor=#d6d6d6
| 286359 ||  || — || December 14, 2001 || Socorro || LINEAR || — || align=right | 4.3 km || 
|-id=360 bgcolor=#d6d6d6
| 286360 ||  || — || December 14, 2001 || Socorro || LINEAR || — || align=right | 3.4 km || 
|-id=361 bgcolor=#fefefe
| 286361 ||  || — || December 14, 2001 || Socorro || LINEAR || NYS || align=right data-sort-value="0.82" | 820 m || 
|-id=362 bgcolor=#fefefe
| 286362 ||  || — || December 14, 2001 || Socorro || LINEAR || V || align=right data-sort-value="0.81" | 810 m || 
|-id=363 bgcolor=#fefefe
| 286363 ||  || — || December 14, 2001 || Socorro || LINEAR || — || align=right data-sort-value="0.69" | 690 m || 
|-id=364 bgcolor=#fefefe
| 286364 ||  || — || December 14, 2001 || Socorro || LINEAR || V || align=right data-sort-value="0.81" | 810 m || 
|-id=365 bgcolor=#fefefe
| 286365 ||  || — || December 14, 2001 || Socorro || LINEAR || NYS || align=right data-sort-value="0.81" | 810 m || 
|-id=366 bgcolor=#d6d6d6
| 286366 ||  || — || December 14, 2001 || Socorro || LINEAR || — || align=right | 3.7 km || 
|-id=367 bgcolor=#fefefe
| 286367 ||  || — || December 14, 2001 || Socorro || LINEAR || MAS || align=right data-sort-value="0.89" | 890 m || 
|-id=368 bgcolor=#d6d6d6
| 286368 ||  || — || December 14, 2001 || Socorro || LINEAR || — || align=right | 5.1 km || 
|-id=369 bgcolor=#d6d6d6
| 286369 ||  || — || December 14, 2001 || Socorro || LINEAR || — || align=right | 3.5 km || 
|-id=370 bgcolor=#fefefe
| 286370 ||  || — || December 14, 2001 || Socorro || LINEAR || — || align=right | 1.5 km || 
|-id=371 bgcolor=#fefefe
| 286371 ||  || — || December 15, 2001 || Socorro || LINEAR || — || align=right | 1.2 km || 
|-id=372 bgcolor=#fefefe
| 286372 ||  || — || December 14, 2001 || Socorro || LINEAR || NYS || align=right data-sort-value="0.81" | 810 m || 
|-id=373 bgcolor=#d6d6d6
| 286373 ||  || — || December 15, 2001 || Socorro || LINEAR || HYG || align=right | 3.1 km || 
|-id=374 bgcolor=#fefefe
| 286374 ||  || — || December 15, 2001 || Socorro || LINEAR || — || align=right data-sort-value="0.70" | 700 m || 
|-id=375 bgcolor=#d6d6d6
| 286375 ||  || — || December 15, 2001 || Socorro || LINEAR || — || align=right | 3.7 km || 
|-id=376 bgcolor=#fefefe
| 286376 ||  || — || December 15, 2001 || Socorro || LINEAR || ERI || align=right | 1.8 km || 
|-id=377 bgcolor=#d6d6d6
| 286377 ||  || — || December 15, 2001 || Socorro || LINEAR || — || align=right | 3.8 km || 
|-id=378 bgcolor=#E9E9E9
| 286378 ||  || — || December 14, 2001 || Socorro || LINEAR || EUN || align=right | 1.7 km || 
|-id=379 bgcolor=#fefefe
| 286379 ||  || — || December 15, 2001 || Socorro || LINEAR || — || align=right data-sort-value="0.94" | 940 m || 
|-id=380 bgcolor=#d6d6d6
| 286380 ||  || — || December 14, 2001 || Socorro || LINEAR || — || align=right | 3.5 km || 
|-id=381 bgcolor=#d6d6d6
| 286381 ||  || — || December 8, 2001 || Anderson Mesa || LONEOS || BRA || align=right | 2.2 km || 
|-id=382 bgcolor=#d6d6d6
| 286382 ||  || — || December 10, 2001 || Socorro || LINEAR || — || align=right | 2.6 km || 
|-id=383 bgcolor=#d6d6d6
| 286383 ||  || — || December 11, 2001 || Socorro || LINEAR || — || align=right | 2.9 km || 
|-id=384 bgcolor=#d6d6d6
| 286384 ||  || — || December 14, 2001 || Palomar || NEAT || — || align=right | 3.9 km || 
|-id=385 bgcolor=#d6d6d6
| 286385 ||  || — || December 17, 2001 || Socorro || LINEAR || — || align=right | 3.7 km || 
|-id=386 bgcolor=#fefefe
| 286386 ||  || — || December 17, 2001 || Socorro || LINEAR || — || align=right data-sort-value="0.95" | 950 m || 
|-id=387 bgcolor=#d6d6d6
| 286387 ||  || — || December 17, 2001 || Socorro || LINEAR || EOS || align=right | 2.6 km || 
|-id=388 bgcolor=#d6d6d6
| 286388 ||  || — || December 17, 2001 || Socorro || LINEAR || KOR || align=right | 1.6 km || 
|-id=389 bgcolor=#fefefe
| 286389 ||  || — || December 17, 2001 || Socorro || LINEAR || — || align=right | 1.4 km || 
|-id=390 bgcolor=#fefefe
| 286390 ||  || — || December 18, 2001 || Socorro || LINEAR || — || align=right | 1.1 km || 
|-id=391 bgcolor=#d6d6d6
| 286391 ||  || — || December 18, 2001 || Socorro || LINEAR || — || align=right | 3.3 km || 
|-id=392 bgcolor=#E9E9E9
| 286392 ||  || — || December 18, 2001 || Socorro || LINEAR || WIT || align=right | 1.4 km || 
|-id=393 bgcolor=#fefefe
| 286393 ||  || — || December 18, 2001 || Socorro || LINEAR || NYS || align=right data-sort-value="0.79" | 790 m || 
|-id=394 bgcolor=#fefefe
| 286394 ||  || — || December 18, 2001 || Socorro || LINEAR || — || align=right data-sort-value="0.99" | 990 m || 
|-id=395 bgcolor=#E9E9E9
| 286395 ||  || — || December 18, 2001 || Socorro || LINEAR || — || align=right | 1.2 km || 
|-id=396 bgcolor=#fefefe
| 286396 ||  || — || December 18, 2001 || Socorro || LINEAR || — || align=right | 1.2 km || 
|-id=397 bgcolor=#fefefe
| 286397 ||  || — || December 18, 2001 || Socorro || LINEAR || NYS || align=right data-sort-value="0.69" | 690 m || 
|-id=398 bgcolor=#fefefe
| 286398 ||  || — || December 18, 2001 || Socorro || LINEAR || — || align=right | 1.0 km || 
|-id=399 bgcolor=#d6d6d6
| 286399 ||  || — || December 18, 2001 || Socorro || LINEAR || THM || align=right | 3.2 km || 
|-id=400 bgcolor=#d6d6d6
| 286400 ||  || — || December 18, 2001 || Socorro || LINEAR || VER || align=right | 4.0 km || 
|}

286401–286500 

|-bgcolor=#d6d6d6
| 286401 ||  || — || December 18, 2001 || Socorro || LINEAR || — || align=right | 4.4 km || 
|-id=402 bgcolor=#fefefe
| 286402 ||  || — || December 18, 2001 || Socorro || LINEAR || V || align=right data-sort-value="0.92" | 920 m || 
|-id=403 bgcolor=#fefefe
| 286403 ||  || — || December 18, 2001 || Socorro || LINEAR || NYS || align=right data-sort-value="0.91" | 910 m || 
|-id=404 bgcolor=#fefefe
| 286404 ||  || — || December 18, 2001 || Socorro || LINEAR || — || align=right data-sort-value="0.94" | 940 m || 
|-id=405 bgcolor=#fefefe
| 286405 ||  || — || December 18, 2001 || Socorro || LINEAR || NYS || align=right data-sort-value="0.79" | 790 m || 
|-id=406 bgcolor=#fefefe
| 286406 ||  || — || December 18, 2001 || Palomar || NEAT || — || align=right | 1.4 km || 
|-id=407 bgcolor=#fefefe
| 286407 ||  || — || December 18, 2001 || Palomar || NEAT || — || align=right | 1.3 km || 
|-id=408 bgcolor=#E9E9E9
| 286408 ||  || — || December 17, 2001 || Socorro || LINEAR || — || align=right | 2.0 km || 
|-id=409 bgcolor=#E9E9E9
| 286409 ||  || — || December 17, 2001 || Socorro || LINEAR || — || align=right | 1.5 km || 
|-id=410 bgcolor=#fefefe
| 286410 ||  || — || December 17, 2001 || Socorro || LINEAR || FLO || align=right data-sort-value="0.84" | 840 m || 
|-id=411 bgcolor=#fefefe
| 286411 ||  || — || December 17, 2001 || Socorro || LINEAR || — || align=right data-sort-value="0.95" | 950 m || 
|-id=412 bgcolor=#d6d6d6
| 286412 ||  || — || December 18, 2001 || Kitt Peak || Spacewatch || — || align=right | 3.9 km || 
|-id=413 bgcolor=#fefefe
| 286413 ||  || — || December 19, 2001 || Socorro || LINEAR || — || align=right | 1.4 km || 
|-id=414 bgcolor=#fefefe
| 286414 ||  || — || December 17, 2001 || Socorro || LINEAR || V || align=right data-sort-value="0.91" | 910 m || 
|-id=415 bgcolor=#d6d6d6
| 286415 ||  || — || December 21, 2001 || Socorro || LINEAR || 615 || align=right | 2.0 km || 
|-id=416 bgcolor=#d6d6d6
| 286416 ||  || — || December 18, 2001 || Kitt Peak || Spacewatch || — || align=right | 3.3 km || 
|-id=417 bgcolor=#d6d6d6
| 286417 ||  || — || December 17, 2001 || Kitt Peak || Spacewatch || — || align=right | 2.7 km || 
|-id=418 bgcolor=#d6d6d6
| 286418 ||  || — || December 19, 2001 || Palomar || NEAT || — || align=right | 5.0 km || 
|-id=419 bgcolor=#d6d6d6
| 286419 ||  || — || December 19, 2001 || Palomar || NEAT || — || align=right | 3.9 km || 
|-id=420 bgcolor=#d6d6d6
| 286420 ||  || — || December 19, 2001 || Socorro || LINEAR || — || align=right | 3.5 km || 
|-id=421 bgcolor=#E9E9E9
| 286421 ||  || — || December 19, 2001 || Socorro || LINEAR || MAR || align=right | 1.3 km || 
|-id=422 bgcolor=#d6d6d6
| 286422 ||  || — || December 19, 2001 || Palomar || NEAT || — || align=right | 3.9 km || 
|-id=423 bgcolor=#d6d6d6
| 286423 ||  || — || December 19, 2001 || Socorro || LINEAR || Tj (2.94) || align=right | 6.7 km || 
|-id=424 bgcolor=#d6d6d6
| 286424 ||  || — || December 20, 2001 || Palomar || NEAT || — || align=right | 3.8 km || 
|-id=425 bgcolor=#fefefe
| 286425 ||  || — || December 18, 2001 || Socorro || LINEAR || — || align=right data-sort-value="0.88" | 880 m || 
|-id=426 bgcolor=#d6d6d6
| 286426 ||  || — || December 18, 2001 || Apache Point || SDSS || — || align=right | 4.2 km || 
|-id=427 bgcolor=#fefefe
| 286427 ||  || — || December 20, 2001 || Apache Point || SDSS || — || align=right | 1.2 km || 
|-id=428 bgcolor=#d6d6d6
| 286428 ||  || — || December 18, 2001 || Palomar || NEAT || EOS || align=right | 2.8 km || 
|-id=429 bgcolor=#fefefe
| 286429 ||  || — || January 5, 2002 || Kitt Peak || Spacewatch || — || align=right | 1.2 km || 
|-id=430 bgcolor=#d6d6d6
| 286430 ||  || — || January 4, 2002 || Palomar || NEAT || — || align=right | 4.2 km || 
|-id=431 bgcolor=#fefefe
| 286431 ||  || — || January 10, 2002 || Campo Imperatore || CINEOS || NYS || align=right data-sort-value="0.96" | 960 m || 
|-id=432 bgcolor=#d6d6d6
| 286432 ||  || — || January 11, 2002 || Campo Imperatore || CINEOS || — || align=right | 4.0 km || 
|-id=433 bgcolor=#fefefe
| 286433 ||  || — || January 9, 2002 || Socorro || LINEAR || H || align=right data-sort-value="0.83" | 830 m || 
|-id=434 bgcolor=#fefefe
| 286434 ||  || — || January 8, 2002 || Socorro || LINEAR || — || align=right data-sort-value="0.79" | 790 m || 
|-id=435 bgcolor=#E9E9E9
| 286435 ||  || — || January 5, 2002 || Haleakala || NEAT || DOR || align=right | 3.5 km || 
|-id=436 bgcolor=#d6d6d6
| 286436 ||  || — || January 8, 2002 || Socorro || LINEAR || — || align=right | 5.5 km || 
|-id=437 bgcolor=#fefefe
| 286437 ||  || — || January 9, 2002 || Socorro || LINEAR || NYS || align=right data-sort-value="0.90" | 900 m || 
|-id=438 bgcolor=#fefefe
| 286438 ||  || — || January 9, 2002 || Socorro || LINEAR || — || align=right | 1.1 km || 
|-id=439 bgcolor=#d6d6d6
| 286439 ||  || — || January 9, 2002 || Socorro || LINEAR || — || align=right | 5.1 km || 
|-id=440 bgcolor=#d6d6d6
| 286440 ||  || — || January 9, 2002 || Socorro || LINEAR || — || align=right | 3.6 km || 
|-id=441 bgcolor=#d6d6d6
| 286441 ||  || — || January 9, 2002 || Socorro || LINEAR || — || align=right | 4.2 km || 
|-id=442 bgcolor=#fefefe
| 286442 ||  || — || January 9, 2002 || Socorro || LINEAR || — || align=right | 1.2 km || 
|-id=443 bgcolor=#fefefe
| 286443 ||  || — || January 9, 2002 || Socorro || LINEAR || MAS || align=right data-sort-value="0.88" | 880 m || 
|-id=444 bgcolor=#d6d6d6
| 286444 ||  || — || January 9, 2002 || Socorro || LINEAR || — || align=right | 3.4 km || 
|-id=445 bgcolor=#d6d6d6
| 286445 ||  || — || January 11, 2002 || Socorro || LINEAR || — || align=right | 4.9 km || 
|-id=446 bgcolor=#d6d6d6
| 286446 ||  || — || January 9, 2002 || Campo Imperatore || CINEOS || — || align=right | 3.9 km || 
|-id=447 bgcolor=#d6d6d6
| 286447 ||  || — || January 8, 2002 || Socorro || LINEAR || — || align=right | 6.4 km || 
|-id=448 bgcolor=#fefefe
| 286448 ||  || — || January 8, 2002 || Socorro || LINEAR || FLO || align=right data-sort-value="0.76" | 760 m || 
|-id=449 bgcolor=#d6d6d6
| 286449 ||  || — || January 8, 2002 || Socorro || LINEAR || — || align=right | 3.1 km || 
|-id=450 bgcolor=#d6d6d6
| 286450 ||  || — || January 8, 2002 || Socorro || LINEAR || — || align=right | 2.6 km || 
|-id=451 bgcolor=#E9E9E9
| 286451 ||  || — || January 8, 2002 || Socorro || LINEAR || — || align=right | 2.9 km || 
|-id=452 bgcolor=#fefefe
| 286452 ||  || — || January 8, 2002 || Socorro || LINEAR || — || align=right | 1.2 km || 
|-id=453 bgcolor=#d6d6d6
| 286453 ||  || — || January 9, 2002 || Socorro || LINEAR || — || align=right | 4.5 km || 
|-id=454 bgcolor=#fefefe
| 286454 ||  || — || January 9, 2002 || Socorro || LINEAR || V || align=right data-sort-value="0.95" | 950 m || 
|-id=455 bgcolor=#d6d6d6
| 286455 ||  || — || January 8, 2002 || Socorro || LINEAR || HYG || align=right | 4.3 km || 
|-id=456 bgcolor=#fefefe
| 286456 ||  || — || January 8, 2002 || Socorro || LINEAR || NYS || align=right data-sort-value="0.94" | 940 m || 
|-id=457 bgcolor=#d6d6d6
| 286457 ||  || — || January 8, 2002 || Socorro || LINEAR || — || align=right | 4.5 km || 
|-id=458 bgcolor=#E9E9E9
| 286458 ||  || — || January 8, 2002 || Socorro || LINEAR || HOF || align=right | 3.6 km || 
|-id=459 bgcolor=#d6d6d6
| 286459 ||  || — || January 9, 2002 || Socorro || LINEAR || — || align=right | 6.4 km || 
|-id=460 bgcolor=#fefefe
| 286460 ||  || — || January 9, 2002 || Socorro || LINEAR || — || align=right | 1.0 km || 
|-id=461 bgcolor=#d6d6d6
| 286461 ||  || — || January 9, 2002 || Socorro || LINEAR || — || align=right | 3.2 km || 
|-id=462 bgcolor=#E9E9E9
| 286462 ||  || — || January 13, 2002 || Socorro || LINEAR || — || align=right | 2.6 km || 
|-id=463 bgcolor=#fefefe
| 286463 ||  || — || January 14, 2002 || Socorro || LINEAR || H || align=right data-sort-value="0.88" | 880 m || 
|-id=464 bgcolor=#E9E9E9
| 286464 ||  || — || January 9, 2002 || Socorro || LINEAR || — || align=right | 1.6 km || 
|-id=465 bgcolor=#fefefe
| 286465 ||  || — || January 9, 2002 || Socorro || LINEAR || — || align=right | 1.4 km || 
|-id=466 bgcolor=#fefefe
| 286466 ||  || — || January 9, 2002 || Socorro || LINEAR || — || align=right | 1.0 km || 
|-id=467 bgcolor=#d6d6d6
| 286467 ||  || — || January 9, 2002 || Socorro || LINEAR || — || align=right | 2.9 km || 
|-id=468 bgcolor=#d6d6d6
| 286468 ||  || — || January 13, 2002 || Socorro || LINEAR || — || align=right | 3.9 km || 
|-id=469 bgcolor=#d6d6d6
| 286469 ||  || — || January 13, 2002 || Socorro || LINEAR || EOS || align=right | 4.0 km || 
|-id=470 bgcolor=#fefefe
| 286470 ||  || — || January 13, 2002 || Socorro || LINEAR || — || align=right | 1.0 km || 
|-id=471 bgcolor=#d6d6d6
| 286471 ||  || — || January 13, 2002 || Palomar || NEAT || — || align=right | 4.1 km || 
|-id=472 bgcolor=#d6d6d6
| 286472 ||  || — || January 14, 2002 || Socorro || LINEAR || — || align=right | 5.7 km || 
|-id=473 bgcolor=#d6d6d6
| 286473 ||  || — || January 14, 2002 || Socorro || LINEAR || EOS || align=right | 2.4 km || 
|-id=474 bgcolor=#E9E9E9
| 286474 ||  || — || January 14, 2002 || Socorro || LINEAR || MRX || align=right | 1.2 km || 
|-id=475 bgcolor=#d6d6d6
| 286475 ||  || — || January 14, 2002 || Socorro || LINEAR || TIR || align=right | 3.7 km || 
|-id=476 bgcolor=#d6d6d6
| 286476 ||  || — || January 13, 2002 || Socorro || LINEAR || — || align=right | 3.9 km || 
|-id=477 bgcolor=#d6d6d6
| 286477 ||  || — || January 13, 2002 || Socorro || LINEAR || EUP || align=right | 4.9 km || 
|-id=478 bgcolor=#fefefe
| 286478 ||  || — || January 14, 2002 || Socorro || LINEAR || V || align=right data-sort-value="0.89" | 890 m || 
|-id=479 bgcolor=#fefefe
| 286479 ||  || — || January 14, 2002 || Socorro || LINEAR || — || align=right data-sort-value="0.94" | 940 m || 
|-id=480 bgcolor=#E9E9E9
| 286480 ||  || — || January 14, 2002 || Socorro || LINEAR || WIT || align=right | 1.4 km || 
|-id=481 bgcolor=#fefefe
| 286481 ||  || — || January 14, 2002 || Socorro || LINEAR || — || align=right | 1.3 km || 
|-id=482 bgcolor=#fefefe
| 286482 ||  || — || January 14, 2002 || Socorro || LINEAR || MAS || align=right data-sort-value="0.99" | 990 m || 
|-id=483 bgcolor=#d6d6d6
| 286483 ||  || — || January 5, 2002 || Palomar || NEAT || — || align=right | 4.4 km || 
|-id=484 bgcolor=#d6d6d6
| 286484 ||  || — || January 8, 2002 || Palomar || NEAT || — || align=right | 3.9 km || 
|-id=485 bgcolor=#d6d6d6
| 286485 ||  || — || January 10, 2002 || Palomar || NEAT || — || align=right | 4.8 km || 
|-id=486 bgcolor=#fefefe
| 286486 ||  || — || January 12, 2002 || Kitt Peak || Spacewatch || — || align=right | 1.1 km || 
|-id=487 bgcolor=#fefefe
| 286487 ||  || — || January 13, 2002 || Socorro || LINEAR || — || align=right data-sort-value="0.82" | 820 m || 
|-id=488 bgcolor=#E9E9E9
| 286488 ||  || — || January 9, 2002 || Socorro || LINEAR || EUN || align=right | 1.8 km || 
|-id=489 bgcolor=#fefefe
| 286489 ||  || — || January 10, 2002 || Palomar || NEAT || — || align=right | 1.1 km || 
|-id=490 bgcolor=#E9E9E9
| 286490 ||  || — || January 13, 2002 || Apache Point || SDSS || — || align=right | 2.4 km || 
|-id=491 bgcolor=#d6d6d6
| 286491 ||  || — || January 13, 2002 || Apache Point || SDSS || ALA || align=right | 4.9 km || 
|-id=492 bgcolor=#E9E9E9
| 286492 ||  || — || January 8, 2002 || Apache Point || SDSS || — || align=right | 1.9 km || 
|-id=493 bgcolor=#d6d6d6
| 286493 ||  || — || January 9, 2002 || Apache Point || SDSS || — || align=right | 4.1 km || 
|-id=494 bgcolor=#d6d6d6
| 286494 ||  || — || January 14, 2002 || Kitt Peak || Spacewatch || CHA || align=right | 2.2 km || 
|-id=495 bgcolor=#E9E9E9
| 286495 ||  || — || January 21, 2002 || Socorro || LINEAR || — || align=right | 1.9 km || 
|-id=496 bgcolor=#fefefe
| 286496 ||  || — || January 21, 2002 || Socorro || LINEAR || H || align=right data-sort-value="0.71" | 710 m || 
|-id=497 bgcolor=#fefefe
| 286497 ||  || — || January 23, 2002 || Socorro || LINEAR || — || align=right | 1.2 km || 
|-id=498 bgcolor=#fefefe
| 286498 ||  || — || January 23, 2002 || Socorro || LINEAR || — || align=right data-sort-value="0.80" | 800 m || 
|-id=499 bgcolor=#d6d6d6
| 286499 ||  || — || January 18, 2002 || Socorro || LINEAR || — || align=right | 3.6 km || 
|-id=500 bgcolor=#fefefe
| 286500 ||  || — || January 19, 2002 || Anderson Mesa || LONEOS || — || align=right | 1.2 km || 
|}

286501–286600 

|-bgcolor=#fefefe
| 286501 ||  || — || January 19, 2002 || Socorro || LINEAR || — || align=right data-sort-value="0.94" | 940 m || 
|-id=502 bgcolor=#d6d6d6
| 286502 ||  || — || January 22, 2002 || Socorro || LINEAR || — || align=right | 4.9 km || 
|-id=503 bgcolor=#d6d6d6
| 286503 ||  || — || January 22, 2002 || Kitt Peak || Spacewatch || — || align=right | 3.3 km || 
|-id=504 bgcolor=#fefefe
| 286504 ||  || — || February 6, 2002 || Kitt Peak || Spacewatch || — || align=right | 1.4 km || 
|-id=505 bgcolor=#fefefe
| 286505 ||  || — || February 6, 2002 || Socorro || LINEAR || — || align=right | 1.2 km || 
|-id=506 bgcolor=#fefefe
| 286506 ||  || — || February 7, 2002 || Socorro || LINEAR || H || align=right | 1.1 km || 
|-id=507 bgcolor=#fefefe
| 286507 ||  || — || February 9, 2002 || Desert Eagle || W. K. Y. Yeung || — || align=right data-sort-value="0.77" | 770 m || 
|-id=508 bgcolor=#d6d6d6
| 286508 ||  || — || February 6, 2002 || Socorro || LINEAR || — || align=right | 3.5 km || 
|-id=509 bgcolor=#fefefe
| 286509 ||  || — || February 5, 2002 || Haleakala || NEAT || — || align=right | 1.5 km || 
|-id=510 bgcolor=#d6d6d6
| 286510 ||  || — || February 7, 2002 || Kitt Peak || Spacewatch || EMA || align=right | 4.7 km || 
|-id=511 bgcolor=#fefefe
| 286511 ||  || — || February 10, 2002 || Socorro || LINEAR || H || align=right data-sort-value="0.82" | 820 m || 
|-id=512 bgcolor=#E9E9E9
| 286512 ||  || — || February 6, 2002 || Socorro || LINEAR || HOF || align=right | 4.1 km || 
|-id=513 bgcolor=#E9E9E9
| 286513 ||  || — || February 6, 2002 || Socorro || LINEAR || — || align=right | 3.0 km || 
|-id=514 bgcolor=#fefefe
| 286514 ||  || — || February 6, 2002 || Socorro || LINEAR || — || align=right data-sort-value="0.91" | 910 m || 
|-id=515 bgcolor=#fefefe
| 286515 ||  || — || February 6, 2002 || Socorro || LINEAR || — || align=right | 1.1 km || 
|-id=516 bgcolor=#fefefe
| 286516 ||  || — || February 7, 2002 || Socorro || LINEAR || — || align=right | 1.1 km || 
|-id=517 bgcolor=#d6d6d6
| 286517 ||  || — || February 7, 2002 || Socorro || LINEAR || — || align=right | 4.2 km || 
|-id=518 bgcolor=#d6d6d6
| 286518 ||  || — || February 7, 2002 || Palomar || NEAT || — || align=right | 3.6 km || 
|-id=519 bgcolor=#E9E9E9
| 286519 ||  || — || February 8, 2002 || Palomar || NEAT || — || align=right | 2.7 km || 
|-id=520 bgcolor=#d6d6d6
| 286520 ||  || — || February 7, 2002 || Socorro || LINEAR || — || align=right | 5.0 km || 
|-id=521 bgcolor=#d6d6d6
| 286521 ||  || — || February 7, 2002 || Socorro || LINEAR || — || align=right | 4.1 km || 
|-id=522 bgcolor=#fefefe
| 286522 ||  || — || February 7, 2002 || Socorro || LINEAR || V || align=right data-sort-value="0.83" | 830 m || 
|-id=523 bgcolor=#fefefe
| 286523 ||  || — || February 7, 2002 || Socorro || LINEAR || — || align=right | 1.1 km || 
|-id=524 bgcolor=#fefefe
| 286524 ||  || — || February 7, 2002 || Socorro || LINEAR || V || align=right data-sort-value="0.95" | 950 m || 
|-id=525 bgcolor=#fefefe
| 286525 ||  || — || February 7, 2002 || Socorro || LINEAR || MAS || align=right data-sort-value="0.83" | 830 m || 
|-id=526 bgcolor=#d6d6d6
| 286526 ||  || — || February 7, 2002 || Socorro || LINEAR || — || align=right | 5.1 km || 
|-id=527 bgcolor=#d6d6d6
| 286527 ||  || — || February 7, 2002 || Socorro || LINEAR || — || align=right | 3.8 km || 
|-id=528 bgcolor=#d6d6d6
| 286528 ||  || — || February 7, 2002 || Socorro || LINEAR || — || align=right | 5.0 km || 
|-id=529 bgcolor=#d6d6d6
| 286529 ||  || — || February 7, 2002 || Socorro || LINEAR || — || align=right | 4.7 km || 
|-id=530 bgcolor=#fefefe
| 286530 ||  || — || February 7, 2002 || Socorro || LINEAR || — || align=right data-sort-value="0.86" | 860 m || 
|-id=531 bgcolor=#fefefe
| 286531 ||  || — || February 7, 2002 || Socorro || LINEAR || NYS || align=right data-sort-value="0.74" | 740 m || 
|-id=532 bgcolor=#fefefe
| 286532 ||  || — || February 7, 2002 || Socorro || LINEAR || — || align=right | 1.1 km || 
|-id=533 bgcolor=#fefefe
| 286533 ||  || — || February 7, 2002 || Socorro || LINEAR || — || align=right | 1.3 km || 
|-id=534 bgcolor=#fefefe
| 286534 ||  || — || February 7, 2002 || Socorro || LINEAR || — || align=right | 1.2 km || 
|-id=535 bgcolor=#E9E9E9
| 286535 ||  || — || February 7, 2002 || Socorro || LINEAR || — || align=right | 1.4 km || 
|-id=536 bgcolor=#fefefe
| 286536 ||  || — || February 7, 2002 || Socorro || LINEAR || — || align=right | 1.0 km || 
|-id=537 bgcolor=#d6d6d6
| 286537 ||  || — || February 7, 2002 || Socorro || LINEAR || HYG || align=right | 3.6 km || 
|-id=538 bgcolor=#fefefe
| 286538 ||  || — || February 7, 2002 || Socorro || LINEAR || FLO || align=right data-sort-value="0.87" | 870 m || 
|-id=539 bgcolor=#fefefe
| 286539 ||  || — || February 7, 2002 || Socorro || LINEAR || — || align=right data-sort-value="0.95" | 950 m || 
|-id=540 bgcolor=#d6d6d6
| 286540 ||  || — || February 7, 2002 || Socorro || LINEAR || — || align=right | 4.2 km || 
|-id=541 bgcolor=#fefefe
| 286541 ||  || — || February 9, 2002 || Socorro || LINEAR || — || align=right | 1.3 km || 
|-id=542 bgcolor=#fefefe
| 286542 ||  || — || February 9, 2002 || Socorro || LINEAR || NYS || align=right data-sort-value="0.99" | 990 m || 
|-id=543 bgcolor=#fefefe
| 286543 ||  || — || February 9, 2002 || Socorro || LINEAR || NYS || align=right data-sort-value="0.91" | 910 m || 
|-id=544 bgcolor=#d6d6d6
| 286544 ||  || — || February 8, 2002 || Kitt Peak || Spacewatch || THM || align=right | 2.5 km || 
|-id=545 bgcolor=#d6d6d6
| 286545 ||  || — || February 6, 2002 || Socorro || LINEAR || — || align=right | 5.1 km || 
|-id=546 bgcolor=#fefefe
| 286546 ||  || — || February 7, 2002 || Socorro || LINEAR || — || align=right | 1.0 km || 
|-id=547 bgcolor=#E9E9E9
| 286547 ||  || — || February 7, 2002 || Socorro || LINEAR || — || align=right | 2.2 km || 
|-id=548 bgcolor=#C2FFFF
| 286548 ||  || — || February 7, 2002 || Socorro || LINEAR || L4 || align=right | 13 km || 
|-id=549 bgcolor=#fefefe
| 286549 ||  || — || February 7, 2002 || Socorro || LINEAR || MAS || align=right data-sort-value="0.99" | 990 m || 
|-id=550 bgcolor=#fefefe
| 286550 ||  || — || February 8, 2002 || Socorro || LINEAR || — || align=right | 1.2 km || 
|-id=551 bgcolor=#fefefe
| 286551 ||  || — || February 8, 2002 || Socorro || LINEAR || V || align=right | 1.0 km || 
|-id=552 bgcolor=#fefefe
| 286552 ||  || — || February 10, 2002 || Socorro || LINEAR || — || align=right | 1.0 km || 
|-id=553 bgcolor=#d6d6d6
| 286553 ||  || — || February 10, 2002 || Socorro || LINEAR || — || align=right | 3.9 km || 
|-id=554 bgcolor=#fefefe
| 286554 ||  || — || February 10, 2002 || Socorro || LINEAR || — || align=right | 1.1 km || 
|-id=555 bgcolor=#E9E9E9
| 286555 ||  || — || February 10, 2002 || Socorro || LINEAR || — || align=right | 1.5 km || 
|-id=556 bgcolor=#E9E9E9
| 286556 ||  || — || February 10, 2002 || Socorro || LINEAR || — || align=right | 2.7 km || 
|-id=557 bgcolor=#fefefe
| 286557 ||  || — || February 10, 2002 || Socorro || LINEAR || NYS || align=right data-sort-value="0.74" | 740 m || 
|-id=558 bgcolor=#d6d6d6
| 286558 ||  || — || February 10, 2002 || Socorro || LINEAR || — || align=right | 3.2 km || 
|-id=559 bgcolor=#fefefe
| 286559 ||  || — || February 10, 2002 || Socorro || LINEAR || — || align=right | 1.3 km || 
|-id=560 bgcolor=#fefefe
| 286560 ||  || — || February 10, 2002 || Socorro || LINEAR || NYS || align=right data-sort-value="0.91" | 910 m || 
|-id=561 bgcolor=#fefefe
| 286561 ||  || — || February 10, 2002 || Socorro || LINEAR || — || align=right data-sort-value="0.77" | 770 m || 
|-id=562 bgcolor=#d6d6d6
| 286562 ||  || — || February 10, 2002 || Socorro || LINEAR || — || align=right | 3.5 km || 
|-id=563 bgcolor=#E9E9E9
| 286563 ||  || — || February 10, 2002 || Socorro || LINEAR || — || align=right | 3.2 km || 
|-id=564 bgcolor=#fefefe
| 286564 ||  || — || February 10, 2002 || Socorro || LINEAR || — || align=right | 1.0 km || 
|-id=565 bgcolor=#fefefe
| 286565 ||  || — || February 10, 2002 || Socorro || LINEAR || MAS || align=right data-sort-value="0.85" | 850 m || 
|-id=566 bgcolor=#E9E9E9
| 286566 ||  || — || February 10, 2002 || Socorro || LINEAR || — || align=right | 2.9 km || 
|-id=567 bgcolor=#d6d6d6
| 286567 ||  || — || February 10, 2002 || Socorro || LINEAR || — || align=right | 4.8 km || 
|-id=568 bgcolor=#d6d6d6
| 286568 ||  || — || February 10, 2002 || Socorro || LINEAR || — || align=right | 3.9 km || 
|-id=569 bgcolor=#fefefe
| 286569 ||  || — || February 10, 2002 || Socorro || LINEAR || FLO || align=right data-sort-value="0.87" | 870 m || 
|-id=570 bgcolor=#E9E9E9
| 286570 ||  || — || February 10, 2002 || Socorro || LINEAR || — || align=right | 1.2 km || 
|-id=571 bgcolor=#C2FFFF
| 286571 ||  || — || February 10, 2002 || Socorro || LINEAR || L4 || align=right | 13 km || 
|-id=572 bgcolor=#E9E9E9
| 286572 ||  || — || February 10, 2002 || Socorro || LINEAR || BRG || align=right | 2.4 km || 
|-id=573 bgcolor=#fefefe
| 286573 ||  || — || February 10, 2002 || Socorro || LINEAR || ERI || align=right | 1.8 km || 
|-id=574 bgcolor=#E9E9E9
| 286574 ||  || — || February 10, 2002 || Socorro || LINEAR || — || align=right | 3.0 km || 
|-id=575 bgcolor=#C2FFFF
| 286575 ||  || — || February 10, 2002 || Socorro || LINEAR || L4 || align=right | 11 km || 
|-id=576 bgcolor=#fefefe
| 286576 ||  || — || February 10, 2002 || Socorro || LINEAR || MAS || align=right data-sort-value="0.98" | 980 m || 
|-id=577 bgcolor=#d6d6d6
| 286577 ||  || — || February 10, 2002 || Socorro || LINEAR || KAR || align=right | 1.3 km || 
|-id=578 bgcolor=#E9E9E9
| 286578 ||  || — || February 10, 2002 || Socorro || LINEAR || — || align=right | 4.0 km || 
|-id=579 bgcolor=#fefefe
| 286579 ||  || — || February 11, 2002 || Socorro || LINEAR || V || align=right | 1.0 km || 
|-id=580 bgcolor=#d6d6d6
| 286580 ||  || — || February 11, 2002 || Socorro || LINEAR || — || align=right | 3.9 km || 
|-id=581 bgcolor=#fefefe
| 286581 ||  || — || February 11, 2002 || Socorro || LINEAR || NYS || align=right data-sort-value="0.99" | 990 m || 
|-id=582 bgcolor=#d6d6d6
| 286582 ||  || — || February 3, 2002 || Haleakala || NEAT || EOS || align=right | 2.9 km || 
|-id=583 bgcolor=#E9E9E9
| 286583 ||  || — || February 6, 2002 || Palomar || NEAT || — || align=right | 3.3 km || 
|-id=584 bgcolor=#fefefe
| 286584 ||  || — || February 8, 2002 || Kitt Peak || Spacewatch || — || align=right data-sort-value="0.75" | 750 m || 
|-id=585 bgcolor=#E9E9E9
| 286585 ||  || — || February 3, 2002 || Palomar || NEAT || — || align=right | 3.5 km || 
|-id=586 bgcolor=#E9E9E9
| 286586 ||  || — || February 4, 2002 || Anderson Mesa || LONEOS || — || align=right | 3.0 km || 
|-id=587 bgcolor=#d6d6d6
| 286587 ||  || — || February 7, 2002 || Palomar || NEAT || — || align=right | 3.0 km || 
|-id=588 bgcolor=#E9E9E9
| 286588 ||  || — || February 6, 2002 || Socorro || LINEAR || — || align=right | 3.3 km || 
|-id=589 bgcolor=#d6d6d6
| 286589 ||  || — || February 6, 2002 || Socorro || LINEAR || — || align=right | 5.3 km || 
|-id=590 bgcolor=#d6d6d6
| 286590 ||  || — || February 7, 2002 || Palomar || NEAT || — || align=right | 2.8 km || 
|-id=591 bgcolor=#E9E9E9
| 286591 ||  || — || February 6, 2002 || Kitt Peak || Spacewatch || — || align=right data-sort-value="0.98" | 980 m || 
|-id=592 bgcolor=#d6d6d6
| 286592 ||  || — || February 8, 2002 || Kitt Peak || Spacewatch || HYG || align=right | 3.3 km || 
|-id=593 bgcolor=#fefefe
| 286593 ||  || — || February 8, 2002 || Kitt Peak || M. W. Buie || — || align=right data-sort-value="0.94" | 940 m || 
|-id=594 bgcolor=#fefefe
| 286594 ||  || — || February 9, 2002 || Kvistaberg || UDAS || — || align=right | 2.1 km || 
|-id=595 bgcolor=#fefefe
| 286595 ||  || — || February 8, 2002 || Kitt Peak || M. W. Buie || MAS || align=right data-sort-value="0.82" | 820 m || 
|-id=596 bgcolor=#d6d6d6
| 286596 ||  || — || February 11, 2002 || Socorro || LINEAR || — || align=right | 4.2 km || 
|-id=597 bgcolor=#fefefe
| 286597 ||  || — || February 10, 2002 || Socorro || LINEAR || — || align=right | 1.1 km || 
|-id=598 bgcolor=#E9E9E9
| 286598 ||  || — || February 13, 2002 || Kitt Peak || Spacewatch || — || align=right | 1.0 km || 
|-id=599 bgcolor=#d6d6d6
| 286599 ||  || — || February 13, 2002 || Socorro || LINEAR || — || align=right | 4.9 km || 
|-id=600 bgcolor=#fefefe
| 286600 ||  || — || February 13, 2002 || Kitt Peak || Spacewatch || MAS || align=right data-sort-value="0.94" | 940 m || 
|}

286601–286700 

|-bgcolor=#fefefe
| 286601 ||  || — || February 8, 2002 || Kitt Peak || Spacewatch || MAS || align=right data-sort-value="0.81" | 810 m || 
|-id=602 bgcolor=#fefefe
| 286602 ||  || — || February 10, 2002 || Socorro || LINEAR || — || align=right data-sort-value="0.89" | 890 m || 
|-id=603 bgcolor=#E9E9E9
| 286603 ||  || — || February 5, 2002 || Palomar || NEAT || — || align=right | 2.0 km || 
|-id=604 bgcolor=#E9E9E9
| 286604 ||  || — || February 14, 2002 || Kitt Peak || Spacewatch || HOF || align=right | 3.0 km || 
|-id=605 bgcolor=#E9E9E9
| 286605 ||  || — || February 14, 2002 || Kitt Peak || Spacewatch || PAD || align=right | 2.0 km || 
|-id=606 bgcolor=#d6d6d6
| 286606 || 2002 DV || — || February 16, 2002 || Bohyunsan || Y.-B. Jeon, B.-C. Lee || — || align=right | 4.5 km || 
|-id=607 bgcolor=#fefefe
| 286607 ||  || — || February 19, 2002 || Socorro || LINEAR || H || align=right | 1.1 km || 
|-id=608 bgcolor=#FA8072
| 286608 ||  || — || February 20, 2002 || Socorro || LINEAR || H || align=right | 1.1 km || 
|-id=609 bgcolor=#d6d6d6
| 286609 ||  || — || February 20, 2002 || Kitt Peak || Spacewatch || — || align=right | 3.6 km || 
|-id=610 bgcolor=#fefefe
| 286610 ||  || — || February 20, 2002 || Kitt Peak || Spacewatch || NYS || align=right data-sort-value="0.65" | 650 m || 
|-id=611 bgcolor=#d6d6d6
| 286611 ||  || — || February 19, 2002 || Socorro || LINEAR || EUP || align=right | 4.6 km || 
|-id=612 bgcolor=#E9E9E9
| 286612 ||  || — || February 20, 2002 || Socorro || LINEAR || — || align=right | 1.6 km || 
|-id=613 bgcolor=#d6d6d6
| 286613 ||  || — || February 21, 2002 || Palomar || NEAT || — || align=right | 4.2 km || 
|-id=614 bgcolor=#fefefe
| 286614 ||  || — || February 16, 2002 || Palomar || NEAT || — || align=right | 1.0 km || 
|-id=615 bgcolor=#E9E9E9
| 286615 ||  || — || February 16, 2002 || Palomar || NEAT || — || align=right | 1.5 km || 
|-id=616 bgcolor=#fefefe
| 286616 ||  || — || February 19, 2002 || Kitt Peak || Spacewatch || — || align=right data-sort-value="0.74" | 740 m || 
|-id=617 bgcolor=#C2FFFF
| 286617 ||  || — || February 16, 2002 || Palomar || NEAT || L4 || align=right | 8.5 km || 
|-id=618 bgcolor=#d6d6d6
| 286618 ||  || — || March 5, 2002 || Socorro || LINEAR || EUP || align=right | 5.7 km || 
|-id=619 bgcolor=#d6d6d6
| 286619 ||  || — || March 5, 2002 || Socorro || LINEAR || EUP || align=right | 6.5 km || 
|-id=620 bgcolor=#fefefe
| 286620 ||  || — || March 6, 2002 || Socorro || LINEAR || H || align=right | 1.1 km || 
|-id=621 bgcolor=#fefefe
| 286621 ||  || — || March 8, 2002 || Ametlla de Mar || J. Nomen || — || align=right | 1.2 km || 
|-id=622 bgcolor=#fefefe
| 286622 ||  || — || March 10, 2002 || Cima Ekar || ADAS || — || align=right data-sort-value="0.93" | 930 m || 
|-id=623 bgcolor=#fefefe
| 286623 ||  || — || March 15, 2002 || Socorro || LINEAR || H || align=right data-sort-value="0.82" | 820 m || 
|-id=624 bgcolor=#fefefe
| 286624 ||  || — || March 4, 2002 || Palomar || NEAT || ERI || align=right | 2.3 km || 
|-id=625 bgcolor=#fefefe
| 286625 ||  || — || March 5, 2002 || Palomar || NEAT || FLO || align=right | 1.0 km || 
|-id=626 bgcolor=#fefefe
| 286626 ||  || — || March 5, 2002 || Kitt Peak || Spacewatch || V || align=right data-sort-value="0.95" | 950 m || 
|-id=627 bgcolor=#fefefe
| 286627 ||  || — || March 9, 2002 || Kitt Peak || Spacewatch || V || align=right data-sort-value="0.93" | 930 m || 
|-id=628 bgcolor=#fefefe
| 286628 ||  || — || March 9, 2002 || Kitt Peak || Spacewatch || SUL || align=right | 2.6 km || 
|-id=629 bgcolor=#fefefe
| 286629 ||  || — || March 10, 2002 || Haleakala || NEAT || — || align=right data-sort-value="0.94" | 940 m || 
|-id=630 bgcolor=#E9E9E9
| 286630 ||  || — || March 5, 2002 || Kitt Peak || Spacewatch || AGN || align=right | 1.6 km || 
|-id=631 bgcolor=#C2FFFF
| 286631 ||  || — || March 10, 2002 || Kitt Peak || Spacewatch || L4 || align=right | 9.7 km || 
|-id=632 bgcolor=#d6d6d6
| 286632 ||  || — || March 11, 2002 || Palomar || NEAT || — || align=right | 3.6 km || 
|-id=633 bgcolor=#fefefe
| 286633 ||  || — || March 9, 2002 || Kitt Peak || Spacewatch || NYS || align=right data-sort-value="0.78" | 780 m || 
|-id=634 bgcolor=#fefefe
| 286634 ||  || — || March 9, 2002 || Kitt Peak || Spacewatch || — || align=right data-sort-value="0.89" | 890 m || 
|-id=635 bgcolor=#d6d6d6
| 286635 ||  || — || March 9, 2002 || Kitt Peak || Spacewatch || — || align=right | 3.5 km || 
|-id=636 bgcolor=#d6d6d6
| 286636 ||  || — || March 12, 2002 || Socorro || LINEAR || ALA || align=right | 5.0 km || 
|-id=637 bgcolor=#fefefe
| 286637 ||  || — || March 13, 2002 || Socorro || LINEAR || — || align=right | 1.1 km || 
|-id=638 bgcolor=#fefefe
| 286638 ||  || — || March 11, 2002 || Palomar || NEAT || FLO || align=right | 1.0 km || 
|-id=639 bgcolor=#fefefe
| 286639 ||  || — || March 12, 2002 || Palomar || NEAT || MAS || align=right data-sort-value="0.89" | 890 m || 
|-id=640 bgcolor=#fefefe
| 286640 ||  || — || March 12, 2002 || Palomar || NEAT || NYS || align=right data-sort-value="0.76" | 760 m || 
|-id=641 bgcolor=#E9E9E9
| 286641 ||  || — || March 12, 2002 || Palomar || NEAT || — || align=right | 1.1 km || 
|-id=642 bgcolor=#fefefe
| 286642 ||  || — || March 12, 2002 || Palomar || NEAT || — || align=right data-sort-value="0.81" | 810 m || 
|-id=643 bgcolor=#fefefe
| 286643 ||  || — || March 12, 2002 || Socorro || LINEAR || V || align=right | 1.1 km || 
|-id=644 bgcolor=#fefefe
| 286644 ||  || — || March 13, 2002 || Socorro || LINEAR || — || align=right data-sort-value="0.95" | 950 m || 
|-id=645 bgcolor=#fefefe
| 286645 ||  || — || March 13, 2002 || Socorro || LINEAR || V || align=right data-sort-value="0.92" | 920 m || 
|-id=646 bgcolor=#fefefe
| 286646 ||  || — || March 13, 2002 || Socorro || LINEAR || — || align=right | 1.2 km || 
|-id=647 bgcolor=#fefefe
| 286647 ||  || — || March 13, 2002 || Socorro || LINEAR || — || align=right data-sort-value="0.93" | 930 m || 
|-id=648 bgcolor=#fefefe
| 286648 ||  || — || March 13, 2002 || Socorro || LINEAR || FLO || align=right data-sort-value="0.73" | 730 m || 
|-id=649 bgcolor=#fefefe
| 286649 ||  || — || March 13, 2002 || Socorro || LINEAR || — || align=right data-sort-value="0.82" | 820 m || 
|-id=650 bgcolor=#fefefe
| 286650 ||  || — || March 13, 2002 || Socorro || LINEAR || — || align=right | 1.1 km || 
|-id=651 bgcolor=#fefefe
| 286651 ||  || — || March 13, 2002 || Socorro || LINEAR || NYS || align=right data-sort-value="0.74" | 740 m || 
|-id=652 bgcolor=#fefefe
| 286652 ||  || — || March 13, 2002 || Socorro || LINEAR || — || align=right | 1.0 km || 
|-id=653 bgcolor=#fefefe
| 286653 ||  || — || March 13, 2002 || Socorro || LINEAR || — || align=right | 1.2 km || 
|-id=654 bgcolor=#fefefe
| 286654 ||  || — || March 9, 2002 || Socorro || LINEAR || MAS || align=right | 1.1 km || 
|-id=655 bgcolor=#fefefe
| 286655 ||  || — || March 13, 2002 || Socorro || LINEAR || FLO || align=right data-sort-value="0.65" | 650 m || 
|-id=656 bgcolor=#fefefe
| 286656 ||  || — || March 14, 2002 || Socorro || LINEAR || — || align=right | 2.2 km || 
|-id=657 bgcolor=#d6d6d6
| 286657 ||  || — || March 14, 2002 || Socorro || LINEAR || ALA || align=right | 7.0 km || 
|-id=658 bgcolor=#E9E9E9
| 286658 ||  || — || March 14, 2002 || Socorro || LINEAR || — || align=right | 1.3 km || 
|-id=659 bgcolor=#E9E9E9
| 286659 ||  || — || March 4, 2002 || Anderson Mesa || LONEOS || — || align=right | 4.3 km || 
|-id=660 bgcolor=#fefefe
| 286660 ||  || — || March 6, 2002 || Socorro || LINEAR || — || align=right data-sort-value="0.91" | 910 m || 
|-id=661 bgcolor=#E9E9E9
| 286661 ||  || — || March 6, 2002 || Socorro || LINEAR || — || align=right | 2.7 km || 
|-id=662 bgcolor=#E9E9E9
| 286662 ||  || — || March 9, 2002 || Kitt Peak || Spacewatch || NEM || align=right | 2.3 km || 
|-id=663 bgcolor=#E9E9E9
| 286663 ||  || — || March 9, 2002 || Anderson Mesa || LONEOS || — || align=right | 3.0 km || 
|-id=664 bgcolor=#fefefe
| 286664 ||  || — || March 9, 2002 || Kitt Peak || Spacewatch || — || align=right data-sort-value="0.83" | 830 m || 
|-id=665 bgcolor=#fefefe
| 286665 ||  || — || March 9, 2002 || Anderson Mesa || LONEOS || — || align=right | 1.5 km || 
|-id=666 bgcolor=#d6d6d6
| 286666 ||  || — || March 10, 2002 || Kitt Peak || Spacewatch || — || align=right | 4.2 km || 
|-id=667 bgcolor=#E9E9E9
| 286667 ||  || — || March 11, 2002 || Kitt Peak || Spacewatch || — || align=right | 2.4 km || 
|-id=668 bgcolor=#E9E9E9
| 286668 ||  || — || March 11, 2002 || Kitt Peak || Spacewatch || — || align=right | 1.8 km || 
|-id=669 bgcolor=#fefefe
| 286669 ||  || — || March 12, 2002 || Palomar || NEAT || NYS || align=right data-sort-value="0.80" | 800 m || 
|-id=670 bgcolor=#fefefe
| 286670 ||  || — || March 13, 2002 || Palomar || NEAT || H || align=right data-sort-value="0.67" | 670 m || 
|-id=671 bgcolor=#d6d6d6
| 286671 ||  || — || March 11, 2002 || Kitt Peak || Spacewatch || — || align=right | 3.0 km || 
|-id=672 bgcolor=#E9E9E9
| 286672 ||  || — || March 12, 2002 || Palomar || NEAT || WIT || align=right | 1.4 km || 
|-id=673 bgcolor=#fefefe
| 286673 ||  || — || March 12, 2002 || Palomar || NEAT || MAS || align=right data-sort-value="0.86" | 860 m || 
|-id=674 bgcolor=#fefefe
| 286674 ||  || — || March 12, 2002 || Palomar || NEAT || — || align=right data-sort-value="0.88" | 880 m || 
|-id=675 bgcolor=#fefefe
| 286675 ||  || — || March 12, 2002 || Palomar || NEAT || MAS || align=right data-sort-value="0.98" | 980 m || 
|-id=676 bgcolor=#d6d6d6
| 286676 ||  || — || March 13, 2002 || Socorro || LINEAR || — || align=right | 2.9 km || 
|-id=677 bgcolor=#fefefe
| 286677 ||  || — || March 13, 2002 || Socorro || LINEAR || — || align=right data-sort-value="0.89" | 890 m || 
|-id=678 bgcolor=#d6d6d6
| 286678 ||  || — || March 14, 2002 || Palomar || NEAT || — || align=right | 5.0 km || 
|-id=679 bgcolor=#fefefe
| 286679 ||  || — || March 15, 2002 || Palomar || NEAT || V || align=right data-sort-value="0.64" | 640 m || 
|-id=680 bgcolor=#fefefe
| 286680 ||  || — || March 15, 2002 || Palomar || NEAT || — || align=right data-sort-value="0.90" | 900 m || 
|-id=681 bgcolor=#fefefe
| 286681 ||  || — || March 15, 2002 || Palomar || NEAT || NYS || align=right data-sort-value="0.81" | 810 m || 
|-id=682 bgcolor=#d6d6d6
| 286682 ||  || — || March 13, 2002 || Palomar || NEAT || TEL || align=right | 1.7 km || 
|-id=683 bgcolor=#d6d6d6
| 286683 ||  || — || March 13, 2002 || Palomar || NEAT || — || align=right | 4.4 km || 
|-id=684 bgcolor=#C2FFFF
| 286684 ||  || — || March 5, 2002 || Apache Point || SDSS || L4 || align=right | 8.5 km || 
|-id=685 bgcolor=#C2FFFF
| 286685 ||  || — || March 13, 2002 || Palomar || NEAT || L4 || align=right | 10 km || 
|-id=686 bgcolor=#fefefe
| 286686 ||  || — || March 19, 2002 || Desert Eagle || W. K. Y. Yeung || — || align=right | 1.1 km || 
|-id=687 bgcolor=#d6d6d6
| 286687 ||  || — || March 20, 2002 || Desert Eagle || W. K. Y. Yeung || BRA || align=right | 2.5 km || 
|-id=688 bgcolor=#E9E9E9
| 286688 ||  || — || March 22, 2002 || Palomar || NEAT || — || align=right | 2.5 km || 
|-id=689 bgcolor=#fefefe
| 286689 ||  || — || March 16, 2002 || Socorro || LINEAR || MAS || align=right data-sort-value="0.94" | 940 m || 
|-id=690 bgcolor=#E9E9E9
| 286690 ||  || — || March 16, 2002 || Socorro || LINEAR || — || align=right | 3.7 km || 
|-id=691 bgcolor=#fefefe
| 286691 ||  || — || March 16, 2002 || Haleakala || NEAT || — || align=right | 1.2 km || 
|-id=692 bgcolor=#d6d6d6
| 286692 ||  || — || March 18, 2002 || Kitt Peak || Spacewatch || TIR || align=right | 3.5 km || 
|-id=693 bgcolor=#d6d6d6
| 286693 Kodaitis ||  ||  || March 16, 2002 || Moletai || K. Černis, J. Zdanavičius || — || align=right | 4.2 km || 
|-id=694 bgcolor=#d6d6d6
| 286694 ||  || — || March 16, 2002 || Haleakala || NEAT || — || align=right | 4.4 km || 
|-id=695 bgcolor=#E9E9E9
| 286695 ||  || — || March 18, 2002 || Kitt Peak || M. W. Buie || — || align=right | 2.8 km || 
|-id=696 bgcolor=#d6d6d6
| 286696 ||  || — || March 19, 2002 || Anderson Mesa || LONEOS || EOS || align=right | 3.0 km || 
|-id=697 bgcolor=#d6d6d6
| 286697 ||  || — || March 20, 2002 || Socorro || LINEAR || BRA || align=right | 2.6 km || 
|-id=698 bgcolor=#d6d6d6
| 286698 ||  || — || March 23, 2002 || Socorro || LINEAR || MEL || align=right | 6.5 km || 
|-id=699 bgcolor=#d6d6d6
| 286699 ||  || — || March 19, 2002 || Haleakala || NEAT || — || align=right | 3.5 km || 
|-id=700 bgcolor=#E9E9E9
| 286700 ||  || — || April 2, 2002 || Palomar || NEAT || — || align=right | 2.7 km || 
|}

286701–286800 

|-bgcolor=#d6d6d6
| 286701 ||  || — || April 15, 2002 || Socorro || LINEAR || — || align=right | 4.8 km || 
|-id=702 bgcolor=#fefefe
| 286702 ||  || — || April 6, 2002 || Cerro Tololo || M. W. Buie || NYS || align=right data-sort-value="0.91" | 910 m || 
|-id=703 bgcolor=#fefefe
| 286703 ||  || — || April 7, 2002 || Cerro Tololo || M. W. Buie || NYS || align=right data-sort-value="0.89" | 890 m || 
|-id=704 bgcolor=#E9E9E9
| 286704 ||  || — || April 2, 2002 || Palomar || NEAT || — || align=right | 1.5 km || 
|-id=705 bgcolor=#d6d6d6
| 286705 ||  || — || April 4, 2002 || Palomar || NEAT || EUP || align=right | 4.1 km || 
|-id=706 bgcolor=#d6d6d6
| 286706 ||  || — || April 4, 2002 || Haleakala || NEAT || — || align=right | 5.2 km || 
|-id=707 bgcolor=#E9E9E9
| 286707 ||  || — || April 5, 2002 || Anderson Mesa || LONEOS || — || align=right | 1.7 km || 
|-id=708 bgcolor=#E9E9E9
| 286708 ||  || — || April 5, 2002 || Palomar || NEAT || — || align=right | 3.0 km || 
|-id=709 bgcolor=#fefefe
| 286709 ||  || — || April 8, 2002 || Palomar || NEAT || MAS || align=right data-sort-value="0.98" | 980 m || 
|-id=710 bgcolor=#fefefe
| 286710 ||  || — || April 8, 2002 || Palomar || NEAT || — || align=right | 1.3 km || 
|-id=711 bgcolor=#d6d6d6
| 286711 ||  || — || April 8, 2002 || Palomar || NEAT || — || align=right | 3.5 km || 
|-id=712 bgcolor=#fefefe
| 286712 ||  || — || April 9, 2002 || Anderson Mesa || LONEOS || — || align=right | 1.0 km || 
|-id=713 bgcolor=#E9E9E9
| 286713 ||  || — || April 9, 2002 || Socorro || LINEAR || EUN || align=right | 1.7 km || 
|-id=714 bgcolor=#d6d6d6
| 286714 ||  || — || April 10, 2002 || Palomar || NEAT || TIR || align=right | 4.0 km || 
|-id=715 bgcolor=#fefefe
| 286715 ||  || — || April 10, 2002 || Socorro || LINEAR || FLO || align=right data-sort-value="0.77" | 770 m || 
|-id=716 bgcolor=#d6d6d6
| 286716 ||  || — || April 10, 2002 || Socorro || LINEAR || — || align=right | 3.6 km || 
|-id=717 bgcolor=#fefefe
| 286717 ||  || — || April 10, 2002 || Socorro || LINEAR || — || align=right | 1.5 km || 
|-id=718 bgcolor=#fefefe
| 286718 ||  || — || April 9, 2002 || Palomar || NEAT || MAS || align=right data-sort-value="0.86" | 860 m || 
|-id=719 bgcolor=#fefefe
| 286719 ||  || — || April 9, 2002 || Socorro || LINEAR || V || align=right | 1.1 km || 
|-id=720 bgcolor=#d6d6d6
| 286720 ||  || — || April 9, 2002 || Socorro || LINEAR || — || align=right | 4.2 km || 
|-id=721 bgcolor=#E9E9E9
| 286721 ||  || — || April 10, 2002 || Socorro || LINEAR || — || align=right | 2.0 km || 
|-id=722 bgcolor=#d6d6d6
| 286722 ||  || — || April 11, 2002 || Anderson Mesa || LONEOS || — || align=right | 4.7 km || 
|-id=723 bgcolor=#E9E9E9
| 286723 ||  || — || April 10, 2002 || Socorro || LINEAR || — || align=right | 1.2 km || 
|-id=724 bgcolor=#d6d6d6
| 286724 ||  || — || April 10, 2002 || Socorro || LINEAR || — || align=right | 3.9 km || 
|-id=725 bgcolor=#fefefe
| 286725 ||  || — || April 10, 2002 || Socorro || LINEAR || ERI || align=right | 2.3 km || 
|-id=726 bgcolor=#fefefe
| 286726 ||  || — || April 11, 2002 || Socorro || LINEAR || V || align=right data-sort-value="0.99" | 990 m || 
|-id=727 bgcolor=#fefefe
| 286727 ||  || — || April 11, 2002 || Socorro || LINEAR || — || align=right | 1.4 km || 
|-id=728 bgcolor=#d6d6d6
| 286728 ||  || — || April 11, 2002 || Socorro || LINEAR || HYG || align=right | 3.8 km || 
|-id=729 bgcolor=#fefefe
| 286729 ||  || — || April 12, 2002 || Palomar || NEAT || FLO || align=right data-sort-value="0.72" | 720 m || 
|-id=730 bgcolor=#fefefe
| 286730 ||  || — || April 12, 2002 || Palomar || NEAT || — || align=right | 1.2 km || 
|-id=731 bgcolor=#d6d6d6
| 286731 ||  || — || April 12, 2002 || Palomar || NEAT || EOS || align=right | 3.1 km || 
|-id=732 bgcolor=#E9E9E9
| 286732 ||  || — || April 12, 2002 || Palomar || NEAT || — || align=right | 3.2 km || 
|-id=733 bgcolor=#fefefe
| 286733 ||  || — || April 12, 2002 || Kitt Peak || Spacewatch || MAS || align=right | 1.00 km || 
|-id=734 bgcolor=#fefefe
| 286734 ||  || — || April 12, 2002 || Socorro || LINEAR || — || align=right | 1.1 km || 
|-id=735 bgcolor=#E9E9E9
| 286735 ||  || — || April 12, 2002 || Socorro || LINEAR || — || align=right | 1.7 km || 
|-id=736 bgcolor=#fefefe
| 286736 ||  || — || April 12, 2002 || Socorro || LINEAR || — || align=right data-sort-value="0.90" | 900 m || 
|-id=737 bgcolor=#fefefe
| 286737 ||  || — || April 12, 2002 || Socorro || LINEAR || NYS || align=right data-sort-value="0.91" | 910 m || 
|-id=738 bgcolor=#d6d6d6
| 286738 ||  || — || April 12, 2002 || Socorro || LINEAR || — || align=right | 2.8 km || 
|-id=739 bgcolor=#d6d6d6
| 286739 ||  || — || April 12, 2002 || Socorro || LINEAR || HYG || align=right | 3.9 km || 
|-id=740 bgcolor=#fefefe
| 286740 ||  || — || April 12, 2002 || Socorro || LINEAR || — || align=right | 1.0 km || 
|-id=741 bgcolor=#d6d6d6
| 286741 ||  || — || April 13, 2002 || Palomar || NEAT || — || align=right | 3.4 km || 
|-id=742 bgcolor=#fefefe
| 286742 ||  || — || April 13, 2002 || Palomar || NEAT || — || align=right | 1.0 km || 
|-id=743 bgcolor=#d6d6d6
| 286743 ||  || — || April 13, 2002 || Kitt Peak || Spacewatch || — || align=right | 4.3 km || 
|-id=744 bgcolor=#fefefe
| 286744 ||  || — || April 12, 2002 || Socorro || LINEAR || — || align=right data-sort-value="0.85" | 850 m || 
|-id=745 bgcolor=#fefefe
| 286745 ||  || — || April 14, 2002 || Palomar || NEAT || FLO || align=right data-sort-value="0.75" | 750 m || 
|-id=746 bgcolor=#d6d6d6
| 286746 ||  || — || April 14, 2002 || Socorro || LINEAR || LIX || align=right | 4.2 km || 
|-id=747 bgcolor=#d6d6d6
| 286747 ||  || — || April 12, 2002 || Palomar || NEAT || — || align=right | 3.9 km || 
|-id=748 bgcolor=#fefefe
| 286748 ||  || — || April 14, 2002 || Palomar || NEAT || NYS || align=right data-sort-value="0.79" | 790 m || 
|-id=749 bgcolor=#fefefe
| 286749 ||  || — || April 10, 2002 || Socorro || LINEAR || — || align=right data-sort-value="0.93" | 930 m || 
|-id=750 bgcolor=#fefefe
| 286750 ||  || — || April 10, 2002 || Socorro || LINEAR || FLO || align=right data-sort-value="0.91" | 910 m || 
|-id=751 bgcolor=#d6d6d6
| 286751 ||  || — || April 10, 2002 || Socorro || LINEAR || — || align=right | 3.5 km || 
|-id=752 bgcolor=#E9E9E9
| 286752 ||  || — || April 5, 2002 || Palomar || NEAT || — || align=right | 3.8 km || 
|-id=753 bgcolor=#fefefe
| 286753 ||  || — || April 4, 2002 || Palomar || NEAT || — || align=right | 1.3 km || 
|-id=754 bgcolor=#fefefe
| 286754 ||  || — || April 5, 2002 || Palomar || NEAT || — || align=right | 1.1 km || 
|-id=755 bgcolor=#fefefe
| 286755 ||  || — || April 11, 2002 || Palomar || NEAT || H || align=right data-sort-value="0.94" | 940 m || 
|-id=756 bgcolor=#d6d6d6
| 286756 ||  || — || April 12, 2002 || Palomar || NEAT || — || align=right | 3.9 km || 
|-id=757 bgcolor=#fefefe
| 286757 ||  || — || April 13, 2002 || Palomar || NEAT || — || align=right | 1.1 km || 
|-id=758 bgcolor=#E9E9E9
| 286758 ||  || — || April 8, 2002 || Palomar || NEAT || EUN || align=right | 1.00 km || 
|-id=759 bgcolor=#d6d6d6
| 286759 ||  || — || April 2, 2002 || Palomar || NEAT || — || align=right | 4.0 km || 
|-id=760 bgcolor=#d6d6d6
| 286760 ||  || — || April 9, 2002 || Palomar || NEAT || HYG || align=right | 3.1 km || 
|-id=761 bgcolor=#E9E9E9
| 286761 ||  || — || February 5, 2006 || Mount Lemmon || Mount Lemmon Survey || — || align=right | 2.7 km || 
|-id=762 bgcolor=#E9E9E9
| 286762 ||  || — || April 16, 2002 || Emerald Lane || L. Ball || — || align=right | 1.4 km || 
|-id=763 bgcolor=#E9E9E9
| 286763 ||  || — || April 17, 2002 || Socorro || LINEAR || BAR || align=right | 1.2 km || 
|-id=764 bgcolor=#fefefe
| 286764 ||  || — || April 22, 2002 || Socorro || LINEAR || H || align=right data-sort-value="0.82" | 820 m || 
|-id=765 bgcolor=#fefefe
| 286765 ||  || — || April 17, 2002 || Socorro || LINEAR || V || align=right data-sort-value="0.82" | 820 m || 
|-id=766 bgcolor=#fefefe
| 286766 ||  || — || April 19, 2002 || Kitt Peak || Spacewatch || MAS || align=right data-sort-value="0.95" | 950 m || 
|-id=767 bgcolor=#fefefe
| 286767 ||  || — || May 4, 2002 || Kitt Peak || Spacewatch || — || align=right | 1.2 km || 
|-id=768 bgcolor=#fefefe
| 286768 ||  || — || May 4, 2002 || Anderson Mesa || LONEOS || — || align=right | 1.1 km || 
|-id=769 bgcolor=#fefefe
| 286769 ||  || — || May 8, 2002 || Socorro || LINEAR || — || align=right | 1.0 km || 
|-id=770 bgcolor=#fefefe
| 286770 ||  || — || May 7, 2002 || Palomar || NEAT || — || align=right data-sort-value="0.81" | 810 m || 
|-id=771 bgcolor=#fefefe
| 286771 ||  || — || May 8, 2002 || Socorro || LINEAR || — || align=right | 1.4 km || 
|-id=772 bgcolor=#d6d6d6
| 286772 ||  || — || May 9, 2002 || Socorro || LINEAR || — || align=right | 4.2 km || 
|-id=773 bgcolor=#fefefe
| 286773 ||  || — || May 9, 2002 || Socorro || LINEAR || — || align=right data-sort-value="0.98" | 980 m || 
|-id=774 bgcolor=#fefefe
| 286774 ||  || — || May 9, 2002 || Socorro || LINEAR || — || align=right | 1.4 km || 
|-id=775 bgcolor=#fefefe
| 286775 ||  || — || May 11, 2002 || Kitt Peak || Spacewatch || V || align=right data-sort-value="0.73" | 730 m || 
|-id=776 bgcolor=#fefefe
| 286776 ||  || — || May 9, 2002 || Socorro || LINEAR || MAS || align=right | 1.1 km || 
|-id=777 bgcolor=#fefefe
| 286777 ||  || — || May 6, 2002 || Socorro || LINEAR || — || align=right | 1.3 km || 
|-id=778 bgcolor=#fefefe
| 286778 ||  || — || May 8, 2002 || Socorro || LINEAR || — || align=right | 1.2 km || 
|-id=779 bgcolor=#E9E9E9
| 286779 ||  || — || May 11, 2002 || Socorro || LINEAR || JUN || align=right | 1.3 km || 
|-id=780 bgcolor=#fefefe
| 286780 ||  || — || May 11, 2002 || Socorro || LINEAR || — || align=right | 1.0 km || 
|-id=781 bgcolor=#fefefe
| 286781 ||  || — || May 11, 2002 || Socorro || LINEAR || FLO || align=right data-sort-value="0.69" | 690 m || 
|-id=782 bgcolor=#fefefe
| 286782 ||  || — || May 11, 2002 || Socorro || LINEAR || — || align=right | 1.1 km || 
|-id=783 bgcolor=#d6d6d6
| 286783 ||  || — || May 11, 2002 || Socorro || LINEAR || — || align=right | 4.3 km || 
|-id=784 bgcolor=#d6d6d6
| 286784 ||  || — || May 11, 2002 || Socorro || LINEAR || — || align=right | 3.3 km || 
|-id=785 bgcolor=#fefefe
| 286785 ||  || — || May 11, 2002 || Socorro || LINEAR || — || align=right data-sort-value="0.78" | 780 m || 
|-id=786 bgcolor=#fefefe
| 286786 ||  || — || May 11, 2002 || Socorro || LINEAR || NYS || align=right data-sort-value="0.66" | 660 m || 
|-id=787 bgcolor=#d6d6d6
| 286787 ||  || — || May 11, 2002 || Socorro || LINEAR || EOS || align=right | 2.9 km || 
|-id=788 bgcolor=#d6d6d6
| 286788 ||  || — || May 11, 2002 || Socorro || LINEAR || EOS || align=right | 3.0 km || 
|-id=789 bgcolor=#E9E9E9
| 286789 ||  || — || May 11, 2002 || Socorro || LINEAR || — || align=right | 1.4 km || 
|-id=790 bgcolor=#fefefe
| 286790 ||  || — || May 12, 2002 || Palomar || NEAT || — || align=right | 2.7 km || 
|-id=791 bgcolor=#fefefe
| 286791 ||  || — || May 8, 2002 || Anderson Mesa || LONEOS || — || align=right | 1.0 km || 
|-id=792 bgcolor=#E9E9E9
| 286792 ||  || — || May 14, 2002 || Socorro || LINEAR || — || align=right | 1.8 km || 
|-id=793 bgcolor=#fefefe
| 286793 ||  || — || May 15, 2002 || Socorro || LINEAR || — || align=right | 1.0 km || 
|-id=794 bgcolor=#fefefe
| 286794 ||  || — || May 6, 2002 || Palomar || NEAT || FLO || align=right data-sort-value="0.74" | 740 m || 
|-id=795 bgcolor=#E9E9E9
| 286795 ||  || — || May 7, 2002 || Anderson Mesa || LONEOS || — || align=right | 1.7 km || 
|-id=796 bgcolor=#fefefe
| 286796 ||  || — || May 8, 2002 || Socorro || LINEAR || — || align=right data-sort-value="0.81" | 810 m || 
|-id=797 bgcolor=#E9E9E9
| 286797 ||  || — || May 8, 2002 || Socorro || LINEAR || — || align=right | 1.2 km || 
|-id=798 bgcolor=#E9E9E9
| 286798 ||  || — || May 8, 2002 || Socorro || LINEAR || JUN || align=right | 1.1 km || 
|-id=799 bgcolor=#fefefe
| 286799 ||  || — || May 9, 2002 || Palomar || NEAT || V || align=right data-sort-value="0.74" | 740 m || 
|-id=800 bgcolor=#d6d6d6
| 286800 ||  || — || May 9, 2002 || Socorro || LINEAR || — || align=right | 5.8 km || 
|}

286801–286900 

|-bgcolor=#E9E9E9
| 286801 ||  || — || May 9, 2002 || Palomar || NEAT || — || align=right | 2.0 km || 
|-id=802 bgcolor=#fefefe
| 286802 ||  || — || May 9, 2002 || Palomar || NEAT || — || align=right | 1.9 km || 
|-id=803 bgcolor=#E9E9E9
| 286803 ||  || — || May 10, 2002 || Palomar || NEAT || — || align=right | 1.2 km || 
|-id=804 bgcolor=#d6d6d6
| 286804 ||  || — || May 6, 2002 || Palomar || NEAT || — || align=right | 4.9 km || 
|-id=805 bgcolor=#fefefe
| 286805 ||  || — || May 12, 2002 || Palomar || NEAT || KLI || align=right | 2.1 km || 
|-id=806 bgcolor=#d6d6d6
| 286806 ||  || — || May 10, 2002 || Palomar || NEAT || EOS || align=right | 2.0 km || 
|-id=807 bgcolor=#fefefe
| 286807 ||  || — || May 4, 2002 || Palomar || NEAT || H || align=right data-sort-value="0.92" | 920 m || 
|-id=808 bgcolor=#d6d6d6
| 286808 ||  || — || May 17, 2002 || Palomar || NEAT || — || align=right | 3.3 km || 
|-id=809 bgcolor=#E9E9E9
| 286809 ||  || — || May 18, 2002 || Palomar || NEAT || — || align=right | 2.4 km || 
|-id=810 bgcolor=#E9E9E9
| 286810 ||  || — || May 21, 2002 || Socorro || LINEAR || BAR || align=right | 1.7 km || 
|-id=811 bgcolor=#FA8072
| 286811 ||  || — || May 22, 2002 || Socorro || LINEAR || — || align=right data-sort-value="0.71" | 710 m || 
|-id=812 bgcolor=#E9E9E9
| 286812 ||  || — || June 6, 2002 || Socorro || LINEAR || EUN || align=right | 1.9 km || 
|-id=813 bgcolor=#fefefe
| 286813 ||  || — || June 9, 2002 || Socorro || LINEAR || FLO || align=right | 1.0 km || 
|-id=814 bgcolor=#fefefe
| 286814 ||  || — || June 9, 2002 || Socorro || LINEAR || — || align=right | 1.2 km || 
|-id=815 bgcolor=#E9E9E9
| 286815 ||  || — || June 1, 2002 || Palomar || NEAT || JUN || align=right | 1.3 km || 
|-id=816 bgcolor=#E9E9E9
| 286816 ||  || — || June 10, 2002 || Socorro || LINEAR || — || align=right | 2.9 km || 
|-id=817 bgcolor=#fefefe
| 286817 ||  || — || June 9, 2002 || Socorro || LINEAR || ERI || align=right | 1.9 km || 
|-id=818 bgcolor=#fefefe
| 286818 ||  || — || June 7, 2002 || Kitt Peak || Spacewatch || — || align=right | 1.1 km || 
|-id=819 bgcolor=#E9E9E9
| 286819 ||  || — || June 8, 2002 || Socorro || LINEAR || MIT || align=right | 3.2 km || 
|-id=820 bgcolor=#E9E9E9
| 286820 ||  || — || June 7, 2002 || Socorro || LINEAR || — || align=right | 2.7 km || 
|-id=821 bgcolor=#d6d6d6
| 286821 ||  || — || June 12, 2002 || Palomar || NEAT || URS || align=right | 4.9 km || 
|-id=822 bgcolor=#E9E9E9
| 286822 ||  || — || June 1, 2002 || Palomar || NEAT || — || align=right | 2.3 km || 
|-id=823 bgcolor=#E9E9E9
| 286823 ||  || — || June 14, 2002 || Socorro || LINEAR || — || align=right | 1.5 km || 
|-id=824 bgcolor=#fefefe
| 286824 ||  || — || June 8, 2002 || Socorro || LINEAR || — || align=right | 1.3 km || 
|-id=825 bgcolor=#E9E9E9
| 286825 ||  || — || June 24, 2002 || Palomar || NEAT || — || align=right | 2.5 km || 
|-id=826 bgcolor=#E9E9E9
| 286826 ||  || — || June 16, 2002 || Palomar || NEAT || — || align=right | 1.3 km || 
|-id=827 bgcolor=#E9E9E9
| 286827 ||  || — || June 20, 2002 || Palomar || NEAT || MIT || align=right | 2.8 km || 
|-id=828 bgcolor=#E9E9E9
| 286828 ||  || — || June 23, 2002 || Palomar || NEAT || — || align=right | 2.2 km || 
|-id=829 bgcolor=#E9E9E9
| 286829 ||  || — || June 27, 2002 || Palomar || NEAT || — || align=right | 3.5 km || 
|-id=830 bgcolor=#fefefe
| 286830 ||  || — || July 1, 2002 || Palomar || NEAT || — || align=right | 1.7 km || 
|-id=831 bgcolor=#E9E9E9
| 286831 ||  || — || July 4, 2002 || Palomar || NEAT || — || align=right | 2.6 km || 
|-id=832 bgcolor=#E9E9E9
| 286832 ||  || — || July 4, 2002 || Kitt Peak || Spacewatch || — || align=right | 2.8 km || 
|-id=833 bgcolor=#E9E9E9
| 286833 ||  || — || July 4, 2002 || Palomar || NEAT || — || align=right | 2.2 km || 
|-id=834 bgcolor=#E9E9E9
| 286834 ||  || — || July 4, 2002 || Palomar || NEAT || — || align=right | 2.1 km || 
|-id=835 bgcolor=#fefefe
| 286835 ||  || — || July 9, 2002 || Socorro || LINEAR || — || align=right | 1.6 km || 
|-id=836 bgcolor=#E9E9E9
| 286836 ||  || — || July 11, 2002 || Socorro || LINEAR || EUN || align=right | 2.2 km || 
|-id=837 bgcolor=#E9E9E9
| 286837 ||  || — || July 14, 2002 || Palomar || NEAT || — || align=right | 2.5 km || 
|-id=838 bgcolor=#fefefe
| 286838 ||  || — || July 14, 2002 || Palomar || NEAT || NYS || align=right data-sort-value="0.81" | 810 m || 
|-id=839 bgcolor=#E9E9E9
| 286839 ||  || — || July 14, 2002 || Palomar || NEAT || JUN || align=right | 1.7 km || 
|-id=840 bgcolor=#E9E9E9
| 286840 ||  || — || July 5, 2002 || Socorro || LINEAR || RAF || align=right | 1.6 km || 
|-id=841 bgcolor=#d6d6d6
| 286841 Annemieke ||  ||  || July 3, 2002 || Palomar || M. Meyer || — || align=right | 3.7 km || 
|-id=842 bgcolor=#d6d6d6
| 286842 Joris ||  ||  || July 3, 2002 || Palomar || M. Meyer || HYG || align=right | 2.7 km || 
|-id=843 bgcolor=#d6d6d6
| 286843 ||  || — || July 12, 2002 || Palomar || NEAT || — || align=right | 4.0 km || 
|-id=844 bgcolor=#fefefe
| 286844 ||  || — || July 8, 2002 || Palomar || NEAT || NYS || align=right data-sort-value="0.73" | 730 m || 
|-id=845 bgcolor=#d6d6d6
| 286845 ||  || — || July 15, 2002 || Palomar || NEAT || TEL || align=right | 3.9 km || 
|-id=846 bgcolor=#E9E9E9
| 286846 ||  || — || July 5, 2002 || Socorro || LINEAR || MIT || align=right | 3.6 km || 
|-id=847 bgcolor=#fefefe
| 286847 ||  || — || July 5, 2002 || Palomar || NEAT || — || align=right data-sort-value="0.78" | 780 m || 
|-id=848 bgcolor=#fefefe
| 286848 ||  || — || July 2, 2002 || Palomar || NEAT || V || align=right | 2.2 km || 
|-id=849 bgcolor=#fefefe
| 286849 ||  || — || July 9, 2002 || Palomar || NEAT || FLO || align=right data-sort-value="0.67" | 670 m || 
|-id=850 bgcolor=#fefefe
| 286850 ||  || — || July 9, 2002 || Palomar || NEAT || — || align=right data-sort-value="0.94" | 940 m || 
|-id=851 bgcolor=#E9E9E9
| 286851 ||  || — || July 9, 2002 || Palomar || NEAT || — || align=right | 2.2 km || 
|-id=852 bgcolor=#E9E9E9
| 286852 ||  || — || July 9, 2002 || Palomar || NEAT || — || align=right | 1.8 km || 
|-id=853 bgcolor=#E9E9E9
| 286853 ||  || — || July 15, 2002 || Palomar || NEAT || — || align=right | 1.4 km || 
|-id=854 bgcolor=#E9E9E9
| 286854 ||  || — || July 14, 2002 || Palomar || NEAT || — || align=right | 1.8 km || 
|-id=855 bgcolor=#d6d6d6
| 286855 ||  || — || July 4, 2002 || Palomar || NEAT || URS || align=right | 5.2 km || 
|-id=856 bgcolor=#E9E9E9
| 286856 ||  || — || July 14, 2002 || Palomar || NEAT || — || align=right | 3.2 km || 
|-id=857 bgcolor=#E9E9E9
| 286857 ||  || — || July 9, 2002 || Palomar || NEAT || — || align=right | 2.1 km || 
|-id=858 bgcolor=#E9E9E9
| 286858 ||  || — || July 3, 2002 || Palomar || NEAT || — || align=right | 1.7 km || 
|-id=859 bgcolor=#E9E9E9
| 286859 ||  || — || July 15, 2002 || Palomar || NEAT || — || align=right | 4.0 km || 
|-id=860 bgcolor=#d6d6d6
| 286860 ||  || — || July 8, 2002 || Palomar || NEAT || — || align=right | 4.8 km || 
|-id=861 bgcolor=#fefefe
| 286861 ||  || — || July 8, 2002 || Palomar || NEAT || V || align=right data-sort-value="0.87" | 870 m || 
|-id=862 bgcolor=#E9E9E9
| 286862 ||  || — || July 12, 2002 || Palomar || NEAT || GEF || align=right | 1.3 km || 
|-id=863 bgcolor=#E9E9E9
| 286863 ||  || — || May 6, 2006 || Mount Lemmon || Mount Lemmon Survey || MIS || align=right | 2.6 km || 
|-id=864 bgcolor=#E9E9E9
| 286864 ||  || — || July 19, 2002 || Palomar || NEAT || — || align=right | 3.6 km || 
|-id=865 bgcolor=#E9E9E9
| 286865 ||  || — || July 20, 2002 || Palomar || NEAT || — || align=right | 2.4 km || 
|-id=866 bgcolor=#fefefe
| 286866 ||  || — || July 18, 2002 || Palomar || NEAT || CIM || align=right | 2.0 km || 
|-id=867 bgcolor=#fefefe
| 286867 ||  || — || July 17, 2002 || Socorro || LINEAR || — || align=right data-sort-value="0.98" | 980 m || 
|-id=868 bgcolor=#E9E9E9
| 286868 ||  || — || July 17, 2002 || Socorro || LINEAR || — || align=right | 2.0 km || 
|-id=869 bgcolor=#E9E9E9
| 286869 ||  || — || July 18, 2002 || Socorro || LINEAR || EUN || align=right | 1.6 km || 
|-id=870 bgcolor=#E9E9E9
| 286870 ||  || — || July 18, 2002 || Socorro || LINEAR || EUN || align=right | 2.1 km || 
|-id=871 bgcolor=#E9E9E9
| 286871 ||  || — || July 18, 2002 || Socorro || LINEAR || — || align=right | 3.3 km || 
|-id=872 bgcolor=#E9E9E9
| 286872 ||  || — || July 18, 2002 || Socorro || LINEAR || — || align=right | 4.0 km || 
|-id=873 bgcolor=#E9E9E9
| 286873 ||  || — || July 27, 2002 || Palomar || NEAT || — || align=right | 3.7 km || 
|-id=874 bgcolor=#E9E9E9
| 286874 ||  || — || July 17, 2002 || Palomar || NEAT || — || align=right | 3.1 km || 
|-id=875 bgcolor=#E9E9E9
| 286875 ||  || — || July 23, 2002 || Palomar || NEAT || — || align=right | 3.0 km || 
|-id=876 bgcolor=#E9E9E9
| 286876 ||  || — || July 23, 2002 || Palomar || NEAT || — || align=right | 1.0 km || 
|-id=877 bgcolor=#E9E9E9
| 286877 ||  || — || July 22, 2002 || Palomar || NEAT || — || align=right | 1.4 km || 
|-id=878 bgcolor=#E9E9E9
| 286878 ||  || — || July 22, 2002 || Palomar || NEAT || — || align=right | 1.5 km || 
|-id=879 bgcolor=#fefefe
| 286879 ||  || — || July 19, 2002 || Palomar || NEAT || — || align=right data-sort-value="0.64" | 640 m || 
|-id=880 bgcolor=#E9E9E9
| 286880 ||  || — || July 22, 2002 || Palomar || NEAT || — || align=right | 2.5 km || 
|-id=881 bgcolor=#d6d6d6
| 286881 ||  || — || July 26, 2002 || Palomar || NEAT || ALA || align=right | 6.1 km || 
|-id=882 bgcolor=#E9E9E9
| 286882 ||  || — || July 18, 2002 || Palomar || NEAT || — || align=right | 1.2 km || 
|-id=883 bgcolor=#E9E9E9
| 286883 ||  || — || March 16, 2005 || Mount Lemmon || Mount Lemmon Survey || PAD || align=right | 1.9 km || 
|-id=884 bgcolor=#fefefe
| 286884 || 2002 PE || — || August 1, 2002 || Needville || Needville Obs. || — || align=right | 1.1 km || 
|-id=885 bgcolor=#d6d6d6
| 286885 ||  || — || August 3, 2002 || Palomar || NEAT || — || align=right | 4.0 km || 
|-id=886 bgcolor=#fefefe
| 286886 ||  || — || August 5, 2002 || Palomar || NEAT || — || align=right | 1.1 km || 
|-id=887 bgcolor=#E9E9E9
| 286887 ||  || — || August 5, 2002 || Campo Imperatore || CINEOS || — || align=right | 1.0 km || 
|-id=888 bgcolor=#fefefe
| 286888 ||  || — || August 6, 2002 || Palomar || NEAT || — || align=right data-sort-value="0.84" | 840 m || 
|-id=889 bgcolor=#FA8072
| 286889 ||  || — || August 6, 2002 || Palomar || NEAT || — || align=right data-sort-value="0.86" | 860 m || 
|-id=890 bgcolor=#E9E9E9
| 286890 ||  || — || August 6, 2002 || Palomar || NEAT || EUN || align=right | 1.6 km || 
|-id=891 bgcolor=#E9E9E9
| 286891 ||  || — || August 6, 2002 || Palomar || NEAT || — || align=right | 3.9 km || 
|-id=892 bgcolor=#fefefe
| 286892 ||  || — || August 6, 2002 || Palomar || NEAT || V || align=right data-sort-value="0.80" | 800 m || 
|-id=893 bgcolor=#d6d6d6
| 286893 ||  || — || August 6, 2002 || Campo Imperatore || CINEOS || — || align=right | 4.1 km || 
|-id=894 bgcolor=#fefefe
| 286894 ||  || — || August 6, 2002 || Palomar || NEAT || MAS || align=right data-sort-value="0.76" | 760 m || 
|-id=895 bgcolor=#fefefe
| 286895 ||  || — || August 7, 2002 || Palomar || NEAT || — || align=right | 1.00 km || 
|-id=896 bgcolor=#fefefe
| 286896 ||  || — || August 11, 2002 || Socorro || LINEAR || H || align=right | 1.0 km || 
|-id=897 bgcolor=#E9E9E9
| 286897 ||  || — || August 10, 2002 || Socorro || LINEAR || DOR || align=right | 5.1 km || 
|-id=898 bgcolor=#E9E9E9
| 286898 ||  || — || August 10, 2002 || Socorro || LINEAR || — || align=right | 3.1 km || 
|-id=899 bgcolor=#E9E9E9
| 286899 ||  || — || August 9, 2002 || Socorro || LINEAR || EUN || align=right | 2.3 km || 
|-id=900 bgcolor=#E9E9E9
| 286900 ||  || — || August 11, 2002 || Socorro || LINEAR || — || align=right | 2.3 km || 
|}

286901–287000 

|-bgcolor=#fefefe
| 286901 ||  || — || August 3, 2002 || Palomar || NEAT || — || align=right | 1.2 km || 
|-id=902 bgcolor=#fefefe
| 286902 ||  || — || August 6, 2002 || Palomar || NEAT || — || align=right data-sort-value="0.73" | 730 m || 
|-id=903 bgcolor=#fefefe
| 286903 ||  || — || August 6, 2002 || Palomar || NEAT || NYS || align=right data-sort-value="0.74" | 740 m || 
|-id=904 bgcolor=#E9E9E9
| 286904 ||  || — || August 13, 2002 || Needville || Needville Obs. || — || align=right | 2.6 km || 
|-id=905 bgcolor=#E9E9E9
| 286905 ||  || — || August 11, 2002 || Socorro || LINEAR || — || align=right | 2.8 km || 
|-id=906 bgcolor=#d6d6d6
| 286906 ||  || — || August 12, 2002 || Socorro || LINEAR || — || align=right | 4.0 km || 
|-id=907 bgcolor=#E9E9E9
| 286907 ||  || — || August 12, 2002 || Socorro || LINEAR || GAL || align=right | 2.0 km || 
|-id=908 bgcolor=#E9E9E9
| 286908 ||  || — || August 12, 2002 || Socorro || LINEAR || ADE || align=right | 2.5 km || 
|-id=909 bgcolor=#E9E9E9
| 286909 ||  || — || August 12, 2002 || Socorro || LINEAR || JUN || align=right | 1.6 km || 
|-id=910 bgcolor=#E9E9E9
| 286910 ||  || — || August 13, 2002 || Socorro || LINEAR || — || align=right | 2.9 km || 
|-id=911 bgcolor=#E9E9E9
| 286911 ||  || — || August 13, 2002 || Fountain Hills || C. W. Juels, P. R. Holvorcem || JUN || align=right | 1.7 km || 
|-id=912 bgcolor=#E9E9E9
| 286912 ||  || — || August 14, 2002 || Palomar || NEAT || — || align=right | 2.7 km || 
|-id=913 bgcolor=#fefefe
| 286913 ||  || — || August 13, 2002 || Kitt Peak || Spacewatch || V || align=right data-sort-value="0.66" | 660 m || 
|-id=914 bgcolor=#E9E9E9
| 286914 ||  || — || August 11, 2002 || Socorro || LINEAR || EUN || align=right | 1.8 km || 
|-id=915 bgcolor=#E9E9E9
| 286915 ||  || — || August 14, 2002 || Socorro || LINEAR || — || align=right | 1.4 km || 
|-id=916 bgcolor=#d6d6d6
| 286916 ||  || — || August 14, 2002 || Socorro || LINEAR || — || align=right | 3.0 km || 
|-id=917 bgcolor=#E9E9E9
| 286917 ||  || — || August 11, 2002 || Palomar || NEAT || EUN || align=right | 1.4 km || 
|-id=918 bgcolor=#E9E9E9
| 286918 ||  || — || August 12, 2002 || Socorro || LINEAR || — || align=right | 1.8 km || 
|-id=919 bgcolor=#E9E9E9
| 286919 ||  || — || August 12, 2002 || Socorro || LINEAR || ADE || align=right | 2.5 km || 
|-id=920 bgcolor=#E9E9E9
| 286920 ||  || — || August 12, 2002 || Socorro || LINEAR || GEF || align=right | 2.1 km || 
|-id=921 bgcolor=#E9E9E9
| 286921 ||  || — || August 12, 2002 || Socorro || LINEAR || GEF || align=right | 1.7 km || 
|-id=922 bgcolor=#E9E9E9
| 286922 ||  || — || August 12, 2002 || Socorro || LINEAR || — || align=right | 2.8 km || 
|-id=923 bgcolor=#fefefe
| 286923 ||  || — || August 12, 2002 || Socorro || LINEAR || V || align=right data-sort-value="0.75" | 750 m || 
|-id=924 bgcolor=#E9E9E9
| 286924 ||  || — || August 12, 2002 || Socorro || LINEAR || — || align=right | 3.0 km || 
|-id=925 bgcolor=#E9E9E9
| 286925 ||  || — || August 12, 2002 || Socorro || LINEAR || — || align=right | 3.6 km || 
|-id=926 bgcolor=#fefefe
| 286926 ||  || — || August 13, 2002 || Socorro || LINEAR || — || align=right data-sort-value="0.93" | 930 m || 
|-id=927 bgcolor=#E9E9E9
| 286927 ||  || — || August 12, 2002 || Socorro || LINEAR || — || align=right | 3.2 km || 
|-id=928 bgcolor=#E9E9E9
| 286928 ||  || — || August 12, 2002 || Socorro || LINEAR || GAL || align=right | 2.2 km || 
|-id=929 bgcolor=#fefefe
| 286929 ||  || — || August 15, 2002 || Kitt Peak || Spacewatch || — || align=right data-sort-value="0.81" | 810 m || 
|-id=930 bgcolor=#E9E9E9
| 286930 ||  || — || August 13, 2002 || Anderson Mesa || LONEOS || — || align=right | 2.0 km || 
|-id=931 bgcolor=#E9E9E9
| 286931 ||  || — || August 13, 2002 || Anderson Mesa || LONEOS || — || align=right | 2.1 km || 
|-id=932 bgcolor=#E9E9E9
| 286932 ||  || — || August 14, 2002 || Kitt Peak || Spacewatch || — || align=right | 2.5 km || 
|-id=933 bgcolor=#E9E9E9
| 286933 ||  || — || August 15, 2002 || Palomar || NEAT || RAF || align=right | 1.4 km || 
|-id=934 bgcolor=#fefefe
| 286934 ||  || — || August 13, 2002 || Socorro || LINEAR || — || align=right | 1.2 km || 
|-id=935 bgcolor=#E9E9E9
| 286935 ||  || — || August 13, 2002 || Anderson Mesa || LONEOS || — || align=right | 2.1 km || 
|-id=936 bgcolor=#E9E9E9
| 286936 ||  || — || August 14, 2002 || Socorro || LINEAR || — || align=right | 3.4 km || 
|-id=937 bgcolor=#E9E9E9
| 286937 ||  || — || August 12, 2002 || Haleakala || NEAT || — || align=right | 2.5 km || 
|-id=938 bgcolor=#E9E9E9
| 286938 ||  || — || August 13, 2002 || Socorro || LINEAR || — || align=right | 2.0 km || 
|-id=939 bgcolor=#E9E9E9
| 286939 ||  || — || August 8, 2002 || Palomar || S. F. Hönig || — || align=right | 1.1 km || 
|-id=940 bgcolor=#fefefe
| 286940 ||  || — || August 8, 2002 || Palomar || S. F. Hönig || — || align=right data-sort-value="0.99" | 990 m || 
|-id=941 bgcolor=#fefefe
| 286941 ||  || — || August 8, 2002 || Palomar || S. F. Hönig || — || align=right data-sort-value="0.94" | 940 m || 
|-id=942 bgcolor=#fefefe
| 286942 ||  || — || August 8, 2002 || Palomar || S. F. Hönig || MAS || align=right data-sort-value="0.76" | 760 m || 
|-id=943 bgcolor=#fefefe
| 286943 ||  || — || August 8, 2002 || Palomar || S. F. Hönig || V || align=right data-sort-value="0.85" | 850 m || 
|-id=944 bgcolor=#E9E9E9
| 286944 ||  || — || August 8, 2002 || Palomar || S. F. Hönig || — || align=right data-sort-value="0.96" | 960 m || 
|-id=945 bgcolor=#E9E9E9
| 286945 ||  || — || August 8, 2002 || Palomar || S. F. Hönig || — || align=right | 1.0 km || 
|-id=946 bgcolor=#E9E9E9
| 286946 ||  || — || August 8, 2002 || Palomar || NEAT || — || align=right data-sort-value="0.94" | 940 m || 
|-id=947 bgcolor=#E9E9E9
| 286947 ||  || — || August 8, 2002 || Palomar || NEAT || — || align=right | 2.4 km || 
|-id=948 bgcolor=#fefefe
| 286948 ||  || — || August 8, 2002 || Palomar || NEAT || NYS || align=right data-sort-value="0.60" | 600 m || 
|-id=949 bgcolor=#E9E9E9
| 286949 ||  || — || August 8, 2002 || Palomar || NEAT || — || align=right | 2.7 km || 
|-id=950 bgcolor=#E9E9E9
| 286950 ||  || — || August 8, 2002 || Palomar || NEAT || — || align=right | 2.0 km || 
|-id=951 bgcolor=#E9E9E9
| 286951 ||  || — || August 15, 2002 || Palomar || NEAT || — || align=right | 1.5 km || 
|-id=952 bgcolor=#E9E9E9
| 286952 ||  || — || August 15, 2002 || Palomar || NEAT || — || align=right | 1.7 km || 
|-id=953 bgcolor=#d6d6d6
| 286953 ||  || — || August 8, 2002 || Palomar || NEAT || URS || align=right | 5.8 km || 
|-id=954 bgcolor=#d6d6d6
| 286954 ||  || — || August 15, 2002 || Palomar || NEAT || — || align=right | 4.1 km || 
|-id=955 bgcolor=#fefefe
| 286955 ||  || — || August 11, 2002 || Palomar || NEAT || NYS || align=right data-sort-value="0.71" | 710 m || 
|-id=956 bgcolor=#fefefe
| 286956 ||  || — || August 11, 2002 || Palomar || NEAT || — || align=right | 1.0 km || 
|-id=957 bgcolor=#E9E9E9
| 286957 ||  || — || August 7, 2002 || Palomar || NEAT || — || align=right | 1.3 km || 
|-id=958 bgcolor=#d6d6d6
| 286958 ||  || — || August 13, 2002 || Socorro || LINEAR || EUP || align=right | 6.9 km || 
|-id=959 bgcolor=#E9E9E9
| 286959 ||  || — || August 8, 2002 || Palomar || NEAT || — || align=right | 2.0 km || 
|-id=960 bgcolor=#E9E9E9
| 286960 ||  || — || August 15, 2002 || Palomar || NEAT || — || align=right | 2.6 km || 
|-id=961 bgcolor=#E9E9E9
| 286961 ||  || — || August 8, 2002 || Palomar || NEAT || — || align=right | 2.1 km || 
|-id=962 bgcolor=#d6d6d6
| 286962 ||  || — || August 15, 2002 || Palomar || NEAT || KOR || align=right | 1.5 km || 
|-id=963 bgcolor=#d6d6d6
| 286963 ||  || — || August 4, 2002 || Palomar || NEAT || — || align=right | 3.5 km || 
|-id=964 bgcolor=#E9E9E9
| 286964 ||  || — || August 8, 2002 || Palomar || NEAT || — || align=right | 2.3 km || 
|-id=965 bgcolor=#d6d6d6
| 286965 ||  || — || August 8, 2002 || Palomar || NEAT || — || align=right | 5.0 km || 
|-id=966 bgcolor=#fefefe
| 286966 ||  || — || August 18, 2006 || Kitt Peak || Spacewatch || — || align=right data-sort-value="0.75" | 750 m || 
|-id=967 bgcolor=#E9E9E9
| 286967 ||  || — || October 8, 2007 || Kitt Peak || Spacewatch || — || align=right | 1.3 km || 
|-id=968 bgcolor=#E9E9E9
| 286968 ||  || — || August 16, 2002 || Palomar || NEAT || — || align=right | 1.1 km || 
|-id=969 bgcolor=#E9E9E9
| 286969 ||  || — || August 19, 2002 || Palomar || NEAT || — || align=right | 2.1 km || 
|-id=970 bgcolor=#E9E9E9
| 286970 ||  || — || August 26, 2002 || Palomar || NEAT || — || align=right | 2.3 km || 
|-id=971 bgcolor=#E9E9E9
| 286971 ||  || — || August 26, 2002 || Palomar || NEAT || — || align=right | 1.0 km || 
|-id=972 bgcolor=#fefefe
| 286972 ||  || — || August 27, 2002 || Palomar || NEAT || V || align=right data-sort-value="0.82" | 820 m || 
|-id=973 bgcolor=#E9E9E9
| 286973 ||  || — || August 28, 2002 || Palomar || NEAT || — || align=right data-sort-value="0.90" | 900 m || 
|-id=974 bgcolor=#E9E9E9
| 286974 ||  || — || August 26, 2002 || Palomar || NEAT || — || align=right | 1.1 km || 
|-id=975 bgcolor=#fefefe
| 286975 ||  || — || August 26, 2002 || Palomar || NEAT || NYS || align=right data-sort-value="0.88" | 880 m || 
|-id=976 bgcolor=#fefefe
| 286976 ||  || — || August 27, 2002 || Palomar || NEAT || — || align=right | 1.1 km || 
|-id=977 bgcolor=#fefefe
| 286977 ||  || — || August 27, 2002 || Palomar || NEAT || MAS || align=right data-sort-value="0.76" | 760 m || 
|-id=978 bgcolor=#fefefe
| 286978 ||  || — || August 29, 2002 || Palomar || NEAT || — || align=right data-sort-value="0.95" | 950 m || 
|-id=979 bgcolor=#E9E9E9
| 286979 ||  || — || August 29, 2002 || Palomar || NEAT || — || align=right | 1.6 km || 
|-id=980 bgcolor=#E9E9E9
| 286980 ||  || — || August 28, 2002 || Palomar || NEAT || — || align=right | 1.2 km || 
|-id=981 bgcolor=#E9E9E9
| 286981 ||  || — || August 28, 2002 || Palomar || NEAT || — || align=right | 2.9 km || 
|-id=982 bgcolor=#E9E9E9
| 286982 ||  || — || August 30, 2002 || Kitt Peak || Spacewatch || — || align=right data-sort-value="0.88" | 880 m || 
|-id=983 bgcolor=#fefefe
| 286983 ||  || — || August 30, 2002 || Kitt Peak || Spacewatch || V || align=right data-sort-value="0.83" | 830 m || 
|-id=984 bgcolor=#E9E9E9
| 286984 ||  || — || August 30, 2002 || Palomar || NEAT || — || align=right | 2.2 km || 
|-id=985 bgcolor=#E9E9E9
| 286985 ||  || — || August 30, 2002 || Palomar || NEAT || — || align=right | 2.4 km || 
|-id=986 bgcolor=#E9E9E9
| 286986 ||  || — || August 30, 2002 || Palomar || NEAT || — || align=right | 1.2 km || 
|-id=987 bgcolor=#d6d6d6
| 286987 ||  || — || August 18, 2002 || Palomar || S. F. Hönig || — || align=right | 3.5 km || 
|-id=988 bgcolor=#E9E9E9
| 286988 ||  || — || August 29, 2002 || Palomar || R. Matson || — || align=right | 2.3 km || 
|-id=989 bgcolor=#d6d6d6
| 286989 ||  || — || August 29, 2002 || Palomar || S. F. Hönig || CHA || align=right | 2.6 km || 
|-id=990 bgcolor=#E9E9E9
| 286990 ||  || — || August 29, 2002 || Palomar || S. F. Hönig || — || align=right | 1.3 km || 
|-id=991 bgcolor=#E9E9E9
| 286991 ||  || — || August 29, 2002 || Palomar || S. F. Hönig || — || align=right | 2.6 km || 
|-id=992 bgcolor=#E9E9E9
| 286992 ||  || — || August 28, 2002 || Palomar || A. Lowe || — || align=right | 1.9 km || 
|-id=993 bgcolor=#fefefe
| 286993 ||  || — || August 17, 2002 || Palomar || A. Lowe || NYS || align=right data-sort-value="0.65" | 650 m || 
|-id=994 bgcolor=#E9E9E9
| 286994 ||  || — || August 29, 2002 || Palomar || S. F. Hönig || — || align=right | 1.0 km || 
|-id=995 bgcolor=#E9E9E9
| 286995 ||  || — || August 29, 2002 || Palomar || S. F. Hönig || — || align=right | 2.5 km || 
|-id=996 bgcolor=#fefefe
| 286996 ||  || — || August 29, 2002 || Palomar || S. F. Hönig || MAS || align=right data-sort-value="0.75" | 750 m || 
|-id=997 bgcolor=#E9E9E9
| 286997 ||  || — || August 28, 2002 || Palomar || NEAT || — || align=right | 2.2 km || 
|-id=998 bgcolor=#fefefe
| 286998 ||  || — || August 19, 2002 || Palomar || NEAT || — || align=right data-sort-value="0.83" | 830 m || 
|-id=999 bgcolor=#E9E9E9
| 286999 ||  || — || August 16, 2002 || Palomar || NEAT || — || align=right | 2.7 km || 
|-id=000 bgcolor=#E9E9E9
| 287000 ||  || — || August 28, 2002 || Palomar || NEAT || MIS || align=right | 3.2 km || 
|}

References

External links 
 Discovery Circumstances: Numbered Minor Planets (285001)–(290000) (IAU Minor Planet Center)

0286